= Close-mid front unrounded vowel =

Vowel sound represented by ⟨e⟩ in IPA

e
- IPA number: 302

Audio sample
- source · help

Encoding
- Entity (decimal): &#101;
- Unicode (hex): U+0065
- X-SAMPA: e
- Braille: ⠑ (braille pattern dots-15)
Image

IPA: Vowels

	Front	Central	Back
Close	i y	ɨ ʉ	ɯ u
Near-close	ɪ ʏ		ʊ
Close-mid	e ø	ɘ ɵ	ɤ o
Mid	e̞ ø̞	ə	ɤ̞ o̞
Open-mid	ɛ œ	ɜ ɞ	ʌ ɔ
Near-open	æ	ɐ
Open	a ɶ	ä	ɑ ɒ

- IPA help
- audio
- full chart
- template

Legend: unrounded • rounded

The close-mid front unrounded vowel, or high-mid front unrounded vowel, is a type of vowel sound, used in some spoken languages. The symbol in the International Phonetic Alphabet that represents this sound is ⟨e⟩.

For the close-mid front unrounded vowel that is usually transcribed with the symbol ⟨ɪ⟩ or ⟨i⟩, see near-close front unrounded vowel. If the usual symbol is ⟨e⟩, the vowel is listed here.

== Features ==
- Its vowel height is close-mid, also known as high-mid, which means the tongue is positioned halfway between a close vowel (a high vowel) and a mid vowel.
- Its vowel backness is front, which means the tongue is positioned forward in the mouth without creating a constriction that would be classified as a consonant.
- It is unrounded, which means that the lips are not rounded.

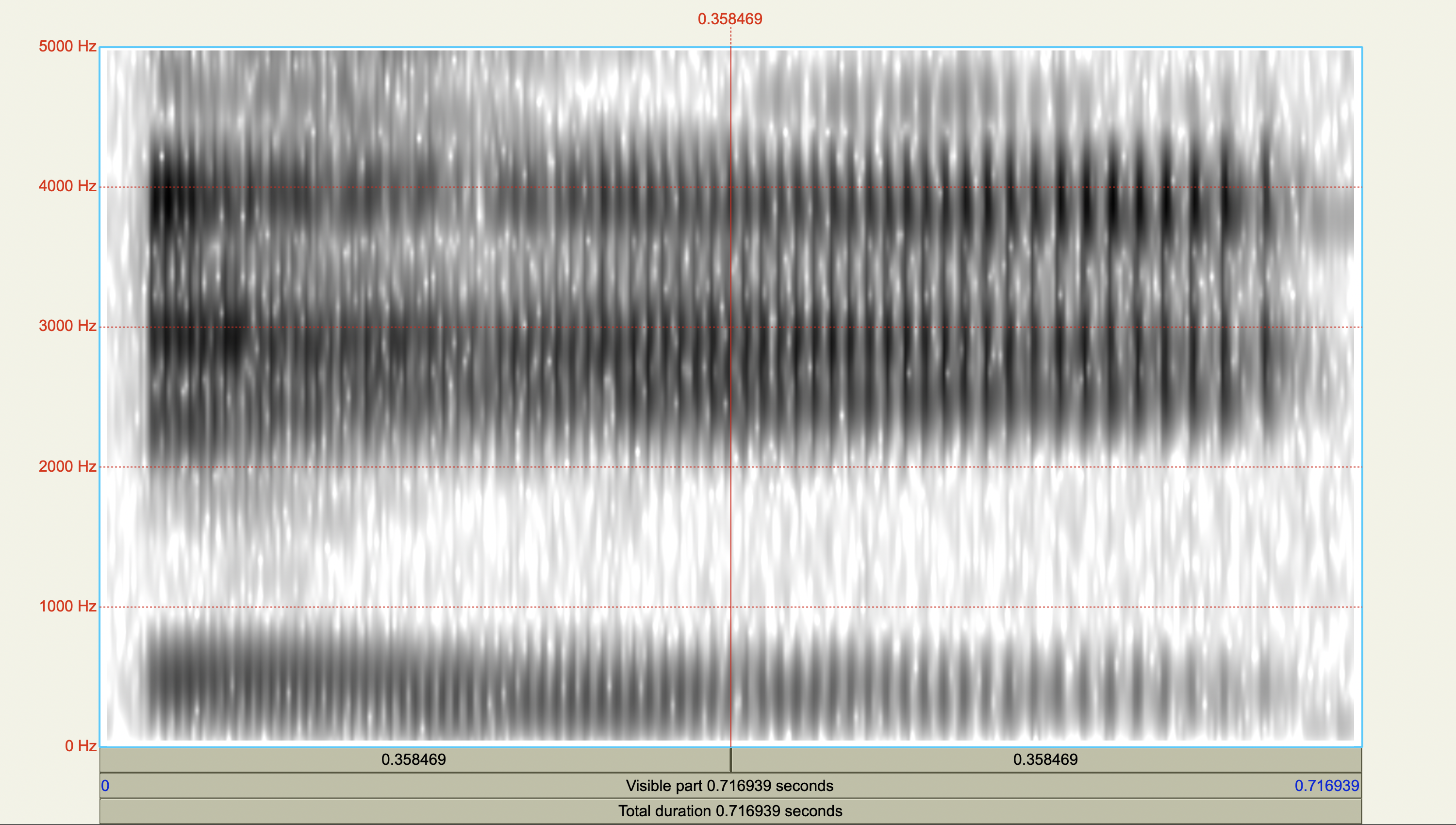
Spectrogram of [e]

== Occurrence ==
Language		Word	IPA	Meaning	Notes
Afrikaans	Standard	bed	[bet]	'bed'	Typically transcribed in IPA with ⟨ɛ⟩. The height varies between close-mid [e] and mid [ɛ̝]. See Afrikaans phonology
Arabic	Standard	مَجۡر۪ىٰهَا/majrēhā	[mad͡ʒ.reː.haː]		See imalah
Azerbaijani		gecə/گئجه	[ɟeˈd͡ʒæ]	'night'	
Bengali		ভেজা	[bʱeʒɐ]	'wet'	See Bengali phonology
Bavarian	Amstetten dialect				
Breton		eget	[eˈɡet]	'than'	
Catalan	Most dialects	séc	[ˈs̺ek]	'fold'	See Catalan phonology
Catalan	Western	sec	[ˈs̺ek]	'dry'	Historical pronunciation, corresponding to /ɛ/ in Central Catalan and /ə/ in many Balearic subdialects. See Catalan phonology
Chinese	Shanghainese	该/kè	[ke̠ʔ˩]	'should'	Near-front; realization of /ɛ/, which appears only in open syllables. Phonetically, it is nearly identical to /ɪ/ ([ɪ̞]), which appears only in closed syllables.
Chuvash		эрешмен/ereşmen	[erɛʃ'mɛnʲ]	'spider'	
Danish	Standard	hæl	[ˈheːˀl]	'heel'	Typically transcribed in IPA with ⟨ɛː⟩. See Danish phonology
Dutch	Belgian	vreemd	[vreːmt]	'strange'	In the Netherlands often diphthongized to [eɪ]. See Dutch phonology
English	Australian	bed	[bed]	'bed'	See Australian English phonology
English	New Zealand	bed	[bed]	'bed'	The height varies from near-close in broad varieties to mid in the Cultivated variety. See New Zealand English phonology
English	General American	may	[meː]	'may'	Most often a closing diphthong [eɪ].
English	General Indian	may	[meː]	'may'	Realized closer to [j̚e].
English	General Pakistani	may	[meː]	'may'	Can be a diphthong [eɪ] instead, depending on speaker.
English	Geordie	may	[meː]	'may'	
English	Scottish	may	[meː]	'may'	
English	Singaporean	may	[meː]	'may'	
English	Ulster	may	[meː]	'may'	Pronounced [ɛː~iə] in Belfast.
English	Some Cardiff speakers	square	[skweː]	'square'	More often open-mid [ɛː].
English	Scouse	square	[skweː]	'square'	May (less commonly) be less open [ɪː] or more open [ɛː] instead, among various other allophones.
English	Scottish	bit	[bë̞ʔ]	'bit'	Near-front, may be [ɪ] (also [ə]) instead for other speakers.
Estonian		keha	[ˈkeɦɑ̝ˑ]	'body'	See Estonian phonology
French		beauté	[bot̪e]	'beauty'	See French phonology
German	Standard	Seele	[ˈzeːlə]	'soul'	See Standard German phonology
German	Many speakers	Jäger	[ˈjeːɡɐ]	'hunter'	Outcome of the /ɛː–eː/ merger found universally in Northern Germany, Eastern Germany and Eastern Austria (often even in formal speech) and in some other regions. See Standard German phonology
German	Southern accents	Bett	[b̥et]	'bed'	Common realization of /ɛ/ in Southern Germany, Switzerland and Austria. See Standard German phonology
German	Swabian accent	Bett	[b̥et]	'bed'	Contrasts with the open-mid [ɛ]. See Standard German phonology
Greek	Sfakian				Corresponds to mid [e̞] in Modern Standard Greek. See Modern Greek phonology
Hebrew		כן/ken	[ke̞n]	'yes'	Hebrew vowels are not shown in the script, see Niqqud and Modern Hebrew phonology
Hindustani	Hindi	तेज़/tez	[t̪eːz]	'fast', 'sharp'	See Hindustani phonology
Hindustani	Urdu	تیز/tez	[t̪eːz]	'fast', 'sharp'	See Hindustani phonology
Hungarian		hét	[heːt̪]	'seven'	Also described as mid [e̞ː]. See Hungarian phonology
Italian	Standard	stelle	[ˈs̪t̪elle]	'stars'	See Italian phonology
Khmer		ទុរេន / turen	[tureːn]	'durian'	See Khmer phonology
Korean		메아리 / meari	[meɐɾi]	'echo'	See Korean phonology
Limburgish	Most dialects	leef	[leːf]	'dear'	The example word is from the Maastrichtian dialect.
Lithuanian		tėtė	[t̪eːt̪eː]	'father'	'Tete' and 'tėtis' are more commonly used than 'tėtė.'
Malay	Standard	kecil	[kə.t͡ʃel]	'small'	Allophone of /i/ in closed-final syllables. May be [ɪ] or [e̞] depending on the speaker. See Malay phonology
Malay	Standard	habis	[ha.bes]	'run out'	Allophone of [ɪ]. See Malay phonology
Malayalam		ചെവി/čevi	[ȶ͡ɕeʋi]	'ear'	See Malayalam phonology
Marathi		एक/ek	[e:k]	'one'	See Marathi phonology
Norwegian		le	[leː]	'laugh'	The example word is from Urban East Norwegian. See Norwegian phonology
Mpade		faɗe	[faɗe]	'night'	
Persian		سه/se	[se]	'three'	
Polish		dzień	[d͡ʑeɲ̟]	'day'	Allophone of /ɛ/ between palatal or palatalized consonants. See Polish phonology
Portuguese		mesa	[ˈmezɐ]	'table'	See Portuguese phonology
Romanian		umple	[ˈumple]	'to fill'	See Romanian phonology
Russian		шея/šeja	[ˈʂejə]	'neck'	Close-mid [e] before and between soft consonants, mid [e̞] after soft consonants. See Russian phonology
Saterland Frisian		tään	[te̠ːn]	'thin'	Near-front; typically transcribed in IPA with ⟨ɛː⟩. Phonetically, it is nearly identical to /ɪ/ ([ɪ̞]). The vowel typically transcribed in IPA with ⟨eː⟩ is actually near-close [e̝ː].
Slovene		sedem	[ˈsèːdəm]	'seven'	See Slovene phonology
Sotho		ho jwetsa	[hʊ̠ʒʷet͡sʼɑ̈]	'to tell'	Contrasts close, near-close and close-mid front unrounded vowels. See Sotho phonology
Swedish	Central Standard	se	[s̪eː]	'see'	Often diphthongized to [eə̯] (hear the word: [s̪eə̯]). See Swedish phonology
Tahitian		vahine	[vahine]	'woman'	
Tamil		செவி/čevi	[ȶ͡ɕeʋi]	'ear'	See Tamil phonology
Ukrainian		ефі́рний efirný	[eˈfirnɪj]	'ethereal'	See Ukrainian phonology
Welsh		chwech	[χweːχ]	'six'	See Welsh phonology
Yoruba		ẹ̀yín	[no example]	'eye'	See Yoruba phonology

== See also ==
- Index of phonetics articles

== Notes ==
Place →	Labial					Coronal										Dorsal					Laryngeal			
Manner ↓	Bilabial		Labiodental		Linguolabial		Dental		Alveolar		Postalveolar		Retroflex		(Alveolo-)palatal		Velar		Uvular		Pharyngeal/epiglottal		Glottal	
Nasal	m̥	m	ɱ̊	ɱ		n̼	n̪̊	n̪	n̥	n	n̠̊	n̠	ɳ̊	ɳ	ɲ̊	ɲ	ŋ̊	ŋ	ɴ̥	ɴ				
Plosive	p	b	p̪	b̪	t̼	d̼	t̪	d̪	t	d			ʈ	ɖ	c	ɟ	k	ɡ	q	ɢ	ʡ		ʔ	
Sibilant affricate							t̪s̪	d̪z̪	ts	dz	t̠ʃ	d̠ʒ	tʂ	dʐ	tɕ	dʑ								
Non-sibilant affricate	pɸ	bβ	p̪f	b̪v			t̪θ	d̪ð	tɹ̝̊	dɹ̝	t̠ɹ̠̊˔	d̠ɹ̠˔			cç	ɟʝ	kx	ɡɣ	qχ	ɢʁ	ʡʜ	ʡʢ	ʔh	
Sibilant fricative							s̪	z̪	s	z	ʃ	ʒ	ʂ	ʐ	ɕ	ʑ								
Non-sibilant fricative	ɸ	β	f	v	θ̼	ð̼	θ	ð	θ̠	ð̠	ɹ̠̊˔	ɹ̠˔	ɻ̊˔	ɻ˔	ç	ʝ	x	ɣ	χ	ʁ	ħ	ʕ	h	ɦ
Approximant		β̞		ʋ				ð̞		ɹ		ɹ̠		ɻ		j		ɰ						˷
Tap/flap		ⱱ̟		ⱱ					ɾ̥	ɾ			ɽ̊	ɽ						ɢ̆		ʡ̆		
Trill	ʙ̥	ʙ							r̥	r		r̠	ɽ̊r̥	ɽr					ʀ̥	ʀ	ʜ	ʢ		
Lateral affricate									tɬ	dɮ			tꞎ	d𝼅	c𝼆	ɟʎ̝	k𝼄	ɡʟ̝						
Lateral fricative							ɬ̪		ɬ	ɮ			ꞎ	𝼅	𝼆	ʎ̝	𝼄	ʟ̝						
Lateral approximant								l̪	l̥	l		l̠	ɭ̊	ɭ	ʎ̥	ʎ	ʟ̥	ʟ		ʟ̠				
Lateral tap/flap									ɺ̥	ɺ			𝼈̊	𝼈		ʎ̆		ʟ̆						

		BL	LD	D	A	PA	RF	P	V	U
Implosive	Voiced	ɓ			ɗ		ᶑ	ʄ	ɠ	ʛ
Implosive	Voiceless	ɓ̥			ɗ̥		ᶑ̊	ʄ̊	ɠ̊	ʛ̥
Ejective	Stop	pʼ			tʼ		ʈʼ	cʼ	kʼ	qʼ
Ejective	Affricate		p̪fʼ	tθʼ	tsʼ	tʃʼ	tʂʼ	tɕʼ	kxʼ	qχʼ
Ejective	Fricative	ɸʼ	fʼ	θʼ	sʼ	ʃʼ	ʂʼ	ɕʼ	xʼ	χʼ
Ejective	Lateral affricate				tɬʼ			c𝼆ʼ	k𝼄ʼ	q𝼄ʼ
Ejective	Lateral fricative				ɬʼ					
Click (top: velar; bottom: uvular)	Tenuis	kʘ qʘ		kǀ qǀ	kǃ qǃ		k𝼊 q𝼊	kǂ qǂ		
Click (top: velar; bottom: uvular)	Voiced	ɡʘ ɢʘ		ɡǀ ɢǀ	ɡǃ ɢǃ		ɡ𝼊 ɢ𝼊	ɡǂ ɢǂ		
Click (top: velar; bottom: uvular)	Nasal	ŋʘ ɴʘ		ŋǀ ɴǀ	ŋǃ ɴǃ		ŋ𝼊 ɴ𝼊	ŋǂ ɴǂ	ʞ	
Click (top: velar; bottom: uvular)	Tenuis lateral				kǁ qǁ					
Click (top: velar; bottom: uvular)	Voiced lateral				ɡǁ ɢǁ					
Click (top: velar; bottom: uvular)	Nasal lateral				ŋǁ ɴǁ					
