= Open-mid central rounded vowel =

Vowel sound represented by ⟨ɞ⟩ in IPA

ɞ
- IPA number: 395

Audio sample
- source · help

Encoding
- Entity (decimal): &#606;
- Unicode (hex): U+025E
- X-SAMPA: 3\
- Braille: ⠦ (braille pattern dots-236) ⠜ (braille pattern dots-345)
Image

IPA: Vowels

	Front	Central	Back
Close	i y	ɨ ʉ	ɯ u
Near-close	ɪ ʏ		ʊ
Close-mid	e ø	ɘ ɵ	ɤ o
Mid	e̞ ø̞	ə	ɤ̞ o̞
Open-mid	ɛ œ	ɜ ɞ	ʌ ɔ
Near-open	æ	ɐ
Open	a ɶ	ä	ɑ ɒ

- IPA help
- audio
- full chart
- template

Legend: unrounded • rounded

The open-mid central rounded vowel, or low-mid central rounded vowel, is a vowel sound used in some spoken languages. The symbol in the International Phonetic Alphabet that represents this sound is ⟨ɞ⟩. The symbol is called closed reversed epsilon. It was added to the IPA in 1993; before that, this vowel was transcribed ⟨ɔ̈⟩.

IPA charts were first published with this vowel transcribed as a closed epsilon, ⟨ʚ⟩ (that is, a closed variant of ⟨ɛ⟩, much as ⟨ɵ⟩ is a closed variant of ⟨e⟩), and this variant made its way into Unicode as U+029A ʚ LATIN SMALL LETTER CLOSED OPEN E. The IPA charts were later changed to the current closed reversed epsilon ⟨ɞ⟩, and this was adopted into Unicode as U+025E ɞ LATIN SMALL LETTER CLOSED REVERSED OPEN E.

== Features ==
- Its vowel height is open-mid, also known as low-mid, which means the tongue is positioned halfway between an open vowel (a low vowel) and a mid vowel.
- Its vowel backness is central, which means the tongue is positioned halfway between a front vowel and a back vowel.
- It is rounded, which means that the lips are rounded rather than spread or relaxed.

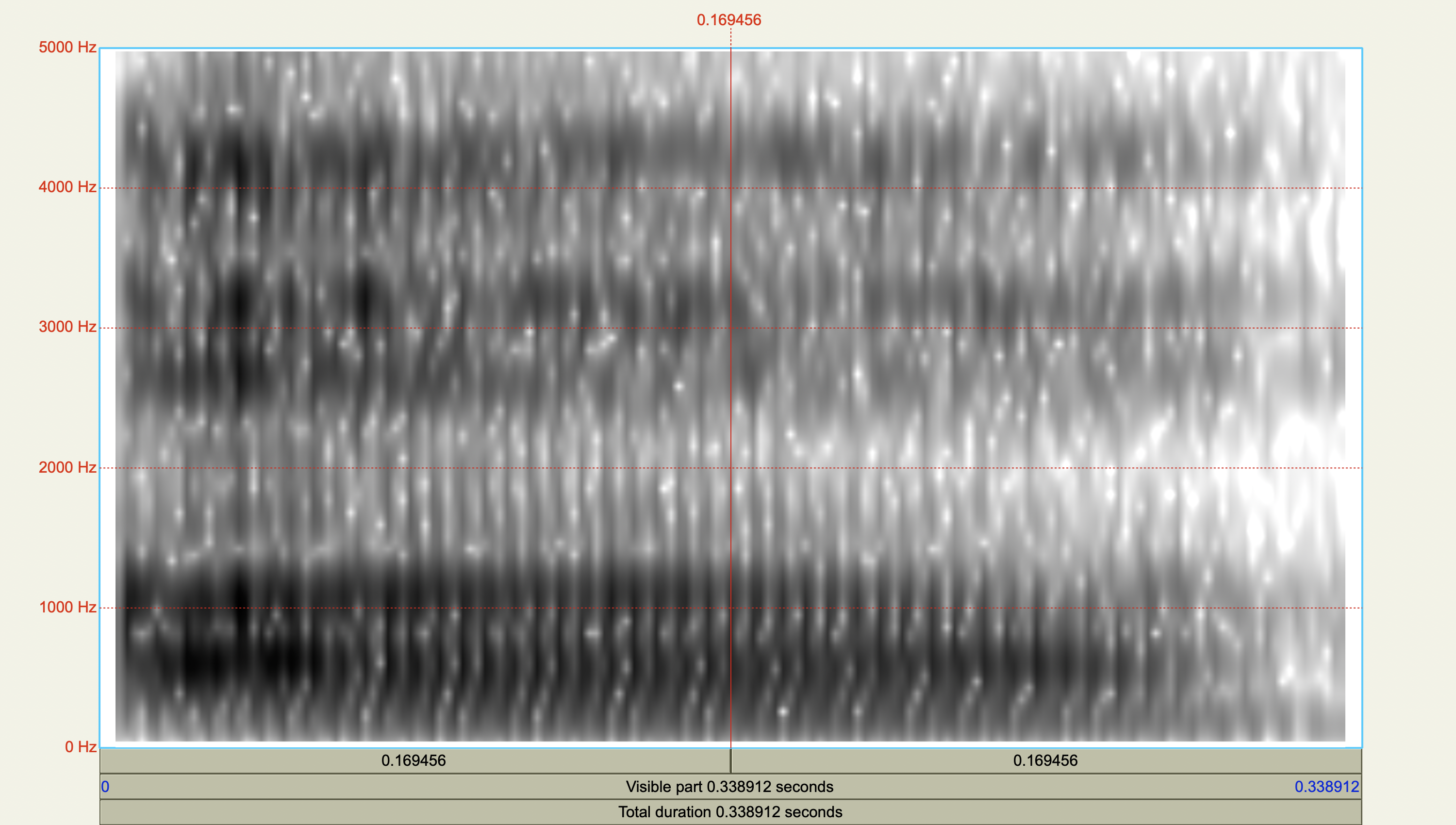
Spectrogram of [ɞ]

== Occurrence ==
Language		Word	IPA	Meaning	Notes
Afrikaans		lug	[lɞχ]	'air'	Also been described as mid [ɞ̝], typically transcribed in IPA with ⟨œ⟩. Many speakers merge /œ/ with /ə/, even in formal speech. See Afrikaans phonology
English	Irish	munch	[mɞnt̠͡ʃ]	'munch'	Corresponds to [ʌ] in other varieties. See English phonology
English	New Zealand	not	[nɞʔt]	'not'	Possible realization of /ɒ/. See New Zealand English phonology
Faroese		høgur	[ˈhɞːʋʊɹ]	'high'	Typically transcribed in IPA with ⟨øː⟩. See Faroese phonology
French	Parisian	port	[pɞːꭓ]	'port', 'harbour'	Described variously as an allophone of /ɔ/ before /ʁ/ and as the default allophone of /ɔ/. See French phonology
German	Chemnitz dialect	Wonne	[ˈʋɞnə]	'bliss'	May be transcribed as ⟨ɞ̝⟩ though ⟨ɞ⟩ is typically used.
Irish		tomhais	[t̪ˠɞːʃ]	'to measure'	See Irish phonology
Kashubian		ptôch	[ptɞx]	'bird'	
Koyukon		-ʉghdonaanh	[ɞɣtɔːnæːn̥]	'son-in-law'	
Limburgish	Maastrichtian	lui	[lɞː]	'lazy'	Allophone of /œy/ in words with Accent 2. May be slightly diphthongal [ɞɵ] itself. It contrasts with the near-open [ɐ̹ː] in words with Accent 2 ([ɐ̹ː] itself is always toneless). It may be transcribed in IPA with ⟨œː⟩, as it is a phonological front vowel.
Mongolian	Khalkha	морь	[mɞ̙r̥ʲ]	'horse'	Allophone of /o/ before a palatalized consonant.
Mortlockese		mér	[mɞr]	'to sleep'	Phonemic vowel.
Mwerlap		N̄wërlap	[ŋʷɞrˈlap]	'Merelava'	
Navajo		tsosts’id	[tsʰɞstsˈɪt]	'seven'	See Navajo phonology
Northern Tiwa	Taos dialect	ącut'uonbo	[ʔãˌtʃʊt̚ːˈʔuɞnbɑ]	'his-garment-around'	Allophone of /ɑ/. See Taos phonology
Panará		[kɾəˈkɞ]		'trousers'	Contrasts with [ə].
Poitevin		o doune	[ɞ dun]	'he gives'	
Scottish Gaelic	Lewis	a-raoir	[rˠɞið̥ʲ]	'last night'	Allophone of /ɤ/ in the diphthong /ɤi/.
West Frisian	Southwestern dialects	boare	[ˈbɞːrə]	'tomcat'	Corresponds to [wa] in other dialects. See West Frisian phonology

== Notes ==
Place →	Labial					Coronal										Dorsal					Laryngeal			
Manner ↓	Bilabial		Labiodental		Linguolabial		Dental		Alveolar		Postalveolar		Retroflex		(Alveolo-)palatal		Velar		Uvular		Pharyngeal/epiglottal		Glottal	
Nasal	m̥	m	ɱ̊	ɱ		n̼	n̪̊	n̪	n̥	n	n̠̊	n̠	ɳ̊	ɳ	ɲ̊	ɲ	ŋ̊	ŋ	ɴ̥	ɴ				
Plosive	p	b	p̪	b̪	t̼	d̼	t̪	d̪	t	d			ʈ	ɖ	c	ɟ	k	ɡ	q	ɢ	ʡ		ʔ	
Sibilant affricate							t̪s̪	d̪z̪	ts	dz	t̠ʃ	d̠ʒ	tʂ	dʐ	tɕ	dʑ								
Non-sibilant affricate	pɸ	bβ	p̪f	b̪v			t̪θ	d̪ð	tɹ̝̊	dɹ̝	t̠ɹ̠̊˔	d̠ɹ̠˔			cç	ɟʝ	kx	ɡɣ	qχ	ɢʁ	ʡʜ	ʡʢ	ʔh	
Sibilant fricative							s̪	z̪	s	z	ʃ	ʒ	ʂ	ʐ	ɕ	ʑ								
Non-sibilant fricative	ɸ	β	f	v	θ̼	ð̼	θ	ð	θ̠	ð̠	ɹ̠̊˔	ɹ̠˔	ɻ̊˔	ɻ˔	ç	ʝ	x	ɣ	χ	ʁ	ħ	ʕ	h	ɦ
Approximant		β̞		ʋ				ð̞		ɹ		ɹ̠		ɻ		j		ɰ						˷
Tap/flap		ⱱ̟		ⱱ					ɾ̥	ɾ			ɽ̊	ɽ						ɢ̆		ʡ̆		
Trill	ʙ̥	ʙ							r̥	r		r̠	ɽ̊r̥	ɽr					ʀ̥	ʀ	ʜ	ʢ		
Lateral affricate									tɬ	dɮ			tꞎ	d𝼅	c𝼆	ɟʎ̝	k𝼄	ɡʟ̝						
Lateral fricative							ɬ̪		ɬ	ɮ			ꞎ	𝼅	𝼆	ʎ̝	𝼄	ʟ̝						
Lateral approximant								l̪	l̥	l		l̠	ɭ̊	ɭ	ʎ̥	ʎ	ʟ̥	ʟ		ʟ̠				
Lateral tap/flap									ɺ̥	ɺ			𝼈̊	𝼈		ʎ̆		ʟ̆						

		BL	LD	D	A	PA	RF	P	V	U
Implosive	Voiced	ɓ			ɗ		ᶑ	ʄ	ɠ	ʛ
Implosive	Voiceless	ɓ̥			ɗ̥		ᶑ̊	ʄ̊	ɠ̊	ʛ̥
Ejective	Stop	pʼ			tʼ		ʈʼ	cʼ	kʼ	qʼ
Ejective	Affricate		p̪fʼ	tθʼ	tsʼ	tʃʼ	tʂʼ	tɕʼ	kxʼ	qχʼ
Ejective	Fricative	ɸʼ	fʼ	θʼ	sʼ	ʃʼ	ʂʼ	ɕʼ	xʼ	χʼ
Ejective	Lateral affricate				tɬʼ			c𝼆ʼ	k𝼄ʼ	q𝼄ʼ
Ejective	Lateral fricative				ɬʼ					
Click (top: velar; bottom: uvular)	Tenuis	kʘ qʘ		kǀ qǀ	kǃ qǃ		k𝼊 q𝼊	kǂ qǂ		
Click (top: velar; bottom: uvular)	Voiced	ɡʘ ɢʘ		ɡǀ ɢǀ	ɡǃ ɢǃ		ɡ𝼊 ɢ𝼊	ɡǂ ɢǂ		
Click (top: velar; bottom: uvular)	Nasal	ŋʘ ɴʘ		ŋǀ ɴǀ	ŋǃ ɴǃ		ŋ𝼊 ɴ𝼊	ŋǂ ɴǂ	ʞ	
Click (top: velar; bottom: uvular)	Tenuis lateral				kǁ qǁ					
Click (top: velar; bottom: uvular)	Voiced lateral				ɡǁ ɢǁ					
Click (top: velar; bottom: uvular)	Nasal lateral				ŋǁ ɴǁ					
