= Mid central vowel =

Vowel sound represented by the schwa, ⟨ə⟩

ə
- IPA number: 322

Audio sample
- source · help

Encoding
- Entity (decimal): &#601;
- Unicode (hex): U+0259
- X-SAMPA: @
- Braille: ⠢ (braille pattern dots-26)
Image

IPA: Vowels

	Front	Central	Back
Close	i y	ɨ ʉ	ɯ u
Near-close	ɪ ʏ		ʊ
Close-mid	e ø	ɘ ɵ	ɤ o
Mid	e̞ ø̞	ə	ɤ̞ o̞
Open-mid	ɛ œ	ɜ ɞ	ʌ ɔ
Near-open	æ	ɐ
Open	a ɶ	ä	ɑ ɒ

- IPA help
- audio
- full chart
- template

Legend: unrounded • rounded

The mid central vowel is a type of vowel sound, used in some spoken languages. A reduced mid central vowel is known as a schwa. The symbol in the International Phonetic Alphabet that represents either sound is ⟨ə⟩, a rotated lowercase letter e.

The word schwa comes from the Hebrew shva (via German), a niqqud, which in most cases in Modern Hebrew denotes a de-emphasis of an accompanying vowel that would otherwise be pronounced strongly. Shva itself is silent and is not a mid central vowel, which does not exist in Modern Hebrew.

While the Handbook of the International Phonetic Association does not define the roundedness of [ə], a schwa is more often unrounded than rounded. The phonetician Jane Setter describes the pronunciation of the unrounded variant as follows: "a sound which can be produced by basically relaxing the articulators in the oral cavity and vocalising." To produce the rounded variant, all that needs to be done in addition to that is to round the lips.

Afrikaans contrasts unrounded and rounded mid central vowels; the latter is usually transcribed with ⟨œ⟩. The contrast is not very stable, and many speakers use an unrounded vowel in both cases.

Danish and Luxembourgish have a mid central vowel that is variably rounded. In other languages, the change in rounding is accompanied with a change in height or backness. For instance, in Dutch, the unrounded allophone of /ə/ is mid central unrounded [ə], but its word-final rounded allophone is close-mid front rounded [ø̜], close to the main allophone of /ʏ/.

"Mid central vowel" and "schwa" do not always mean the same thing, and the symbol ⟨ə⟩ is often used for any obscure vowel, regardless of its precise quality. For instance, the unstressed English vowel transcribed ⟨ə⟩ and called "schwa" is a central unrounded vowel that can be close-mid [ɘ], mid [ə] or open-mid [ɜ], depending on the environment. The French vowel transcribed that way is closer to [ø].

If a mid-central vowel of a language is not a reduced vowel, or if it may be stressed, it may be more unambiguous to transcribe it with one of the other mid-central vowel letters: ⟨ɘ ɜ⟩ for an unrounded vowel or ⟨ɵ ɞ⟩ for a rounded vowel.

== Mid central unrounded vowel ==
The mid central unrounded vowel is frequently written with the symbol ⟨ə⟩. If greater precision is desired, the symbol for the close-mid central unrounded vowel may be used with a lowering diacritic, ⟨ɘ̞⟩, or for the open-mid central unrounded vowel with a raising diacritic, ⟨ɜ̝⟩.

=== Features ===
- Its vowel height is mid, which means the tongue is positioned halfway between a close vowel and an open vowel.
- Its vowel backness is central, which means the tongue is positioned halfway between a front vowel and a back vowel.
- It is unrounded, which means that the lips are not rounded.

=== Occurrence ===
Language		Word	IPA	Meaning	Notes
Albanian		një	[ɲə]	'one'	
Afrikaans	Standard	lig	[ləχ]	'light'	Also described as open-mid [ɜ]. See Afrikaans phonology
Afrikaans	Many speakers	lug	[ləχ]	'air'	Many speakers merge /œ/ with /ə/, even in formal speech. See Afrikaans phonology
Arabic	Damascene	كرمال	[kɪɾ.məːl]	'for the sake of'	Realized as /a/ by some speakers.
Bhojpuri		कर	[kər]	'to do'	
Catalan	Some Balearic speakers	sec	[ˈs̺ək]	'dry'	Closer and rounded [ɵ] in Mallorcan. Stressable schwa that usually corresponds to the open-mid /ɛ/ in Standard Central Catalan and the close-mid /e/ in Western dialects. See Catalan phonology
Catalan	Eastern	amb	[əm(b)]	'with'	Reduced vowel. The exact height, backness and rounding are variable. See Catalan phonology
Catalan	Some Western accents	amb	[əm(b)]	'with'	Reduced vowel. The exact height, backness and rounding are variable. See Catalan phonology
Chinese	Hokkien	lêr (螺)	[lə˨˦]	'snail'	
Chinese	Mandarin	根/gēn	[kən˥]	'root'	See Standard Chinese phonology
Chuvash		ăман	[əm'an]	'worm'	
Danish	Standard	hoppe	[ˈhʌ̹pə]	'mare'	Sometimes realized as rounded [ə̹]. See Danish phonology
Dutch	Standard	renner	[ˈrɛnər]	'runner'	The backness varies between near-front and central, whereas the height varies between close-mid and open-mid. Many speakers feel that this vowel is simply an unstressed allophone of /ʏ/. See Dutch phonology
English	Most dialects	arena	[əˈɹiːnə]	'arena'	Reduced vowel; varies in height between close-mid and open-mid. Word-final /ə/ can be as low as [ɐ]. See English phonology
English	Cultivated South African	bird	[bə̞ːd]	'bird'	May be transcribed in IPA with ⟨ɜː⟩. Other South African varieties use a higher, more front and rounded vowel [øː~ ø̈ː]. See South African English phonology
English	Norfolk	bird	[bə̞ːd]	'bird'	
English	Received Pronunciation	bird	[bə̞ːd]	'bird'	Often transcribed in IPA with ⟨ɜː⟩. It is sulcalized, which means the tongue is grooved like in [ɹ]. 'Upper Crust RP' speakers pronounce a near-open vowel [ɐː], but for some other speakers it may actually be open-mid [ɜː]. This vowel corresponds to rhotacized [ɝ] in rhotic dialects.
English	Geordie	bust	[bəst]	'bust'	Spoken by some middle class speakers, mostly female; other speakers use [ʊ]. Corresponds to /ɜ/ or /ʌ/ in other dialects.
English	Indian	bust	[bəst]	'bust'	May be lower. Some Indian varieties merge /ɜ/ or /ʌ/ with /ə/ like Welsh English.
English	Wales	bust	[bəst]	'bust'	May also be further back; it corresponds to /ɜ/ or /ʌ/ in other dialects.
English	Yorkshire	bust	[bəst]	'bust'	Middle class pronunciation. Other speakers use [ʊ]. Corresponds to /ɜ/ or /ʌ/ in other dialects.
Faroese	Tórshavn	vátur	[ˈvɔaːtəɹ]	'yellow'	See Faroese phonology
Faroese	Northeastern dialects	vátur	[ˈvaːtəɹ]	'yellow'	See Faroese phonology
Galician	Some dialects	leite	[ˈlejtə]	'milk'	Alternative realization of final unstressed /e/ or /ɛ/ (normally [i ~ ɪ ~ e̝]), it may occur in any position. See Galician phonology
German	Standard	Beschlag	[b̥əˈʃläːk]	'fitting'	See Standard German phonology
German	Southern German accents	oder	[ˈoːdə]	'or'	Used instead of [ɐ]. See Standard German phonology
Georgian		დგას/dgas	[dəɡas]	'to stand', 1st p. s.	Phonetically inserted to break up consonant clusters. See Georgian phonology
Hindustani	Hindi	हमसफ़र (hamsafar)	['ɦəm.sə.fəɾ]	'travelling companion', 'sweetheart', 'darling' or 'lover'	See Hindustani phonology.
Hindustani	Urdu	ہمسفر (hamsafar)	['ɦəm.sə.fəɾ]	'travelling companion', 'sweetheart', 'darling' or 'lover'	See Hindustani phonology.
Indonesian		berat	[bə.rat]	'heavy'	See Malay phonology
Kashmiri		کٔژ	[kət͡s]	'how many'	
Kashubian		Kaszëbë	[kaʃəbə]	'Kashubia'	
Kensiu			[təh]	'to be bald'	Contrasts with a rhotacized close-mid [ɚ̝].
Khanty		аԓәӈ	[aɬəŋ]	'early'	Reduced vowel. Occurs only in unstressed syllables. See Khanty phonology
Khmer		ដឹក dœ̆k	[ɗək]	'to transport'	See Khmer phonology
Korean	Southern Gyeongsang dialect	거미	[kəmi]	'spider'	In southern Gyeongsang, The sounds ㅡ(eu)/ɯ/ and ㅓ(eo)/ʌ/ merge with /ə/.
Kurdish	Sorani (Central)	گەردوون / gerdûn	[gərduːn]	'cosmos'	See Kurdish phonology
Kurdish	Palewani (Southern)	گەردوون / gerdûn	[gərduːn]	'cosmos'	See Kurdish phonology
Luxembourgish		dënn	[d̥ən]	'thin'	More often realized as slightly rounded [ə̹]. See Luxembourgish phonology
Malay	Standard	berat	[bə.rat]	'heavy'	Realization of word-final /a/. See Malay phonology
Malay	Standard	apa	[a.pə]	'what'	Pronunciation of word-final ⟨a⟩ of root morphemes and before ⟨h⟩. Corresponds to /a/ in /a/-varieties. See Malay phonology
Malay	Johor-Riau	apa	[a.pə]	'what'	Pronunciation of word-final ⟨a⟩ of root morphemes and before ⟨h⟩. Corresponds to /a/ in /a/-varieties. See Malay phonology
Malay	Terengganu	apa	[a.pə]	'what'	Pronunciation of word-final ⟨a⟩ of root morphemes and before ⟨h⟩. Corresponds to /a/ in /a/-varieties. See Malay phonology
Malay	Jakarta	datang	[da.təŋ]	'to come'	Usually occurs around Jakarta, often inherited from earlier Proto-Malayic syllable *-CəC. For the dialects in Sumatra in which the word-final /a/ letter ([a]) changes to an [ə] sound, see Malay phonology.
Malay	Palembang	datang	[da.təŋ]	'to come'	
Moksha		търва	[tərvaˑ]	'lip'	See Moksha phonology
Norwegian	Many dialects	sterkeste	[²stæɾkəstə]	'the strongest'	Occurs only in unstressed syllables. The example word is from Urban East Norwegian. Some dialects (e.g. Trondheimsk) lack this sound. See Norwegian phonology
Neapolitan		vède / vère	[veɾ(ə)]	"to see"	The final schwa sound might become "mute" or left out entirely. Schwa sounds might also be denoted with a diaeresis (I.e "vèrë" but it is not universal. See Neapolitan Phonology
Plautdietsch		bediedt	[bəˈdit]	'means'	The example word is from the Canadian Old Colony variety, in which the vowel is somewhat fronted [ə̟].
Portuguese	Brazilian	maçã	[maˈsə̃ᵑ]	'apple'	Possible realization of final stressed /ɐ̃/. Also can be open-mid [ɜ̃].
Romanian		păros	[pəˈros]	'hairy'	See Romanian phonology
Russian	Standard	корова	[kɐˈrovə]	'cow'	See Russian phonology
Serbo-Croatian	Standard	врт/vrt	[ʋə̂rt̪]	'garden'	[ər] is a possible phonetic realization of the syllabic trill /r̩/ when it occurs between consonants. See Serbo-Croatian phonology
Serbo-Croatian	Torlakian	дьн/dăn	[dən]	'day'	Reflex of Proto-Slavic *ь and *ъ.
Spanish	Some Latin American accents	rata	[ˈrät̪ə]	'rat'	Found in Mexican and Andean Spanish, especially Colombian (from Bogotá). Unstresssed /a/ varies between [ə] and [ɐ]. See Spanish phonology
Swedish	Southern	vante	[²väntə]	'mitten'	Corresponds to a slightly retracted front vowel [ɛ̠] in Central Standard Swedish. See Swedish phonology
Tyap		a̠tan	[ətan]	'ɡood'	
Welsh		mynydd	[mənɪð]	'mountain'	See Welsh phonology

== Mid central rounded vowel ==
Mid central rounded vowel

ɵ̞

ɞ̝

Audio sample
- source · help

Languages may have a mid central rounded vowel (a rounded [ə]), distinct from both the close-mid and open-mid vowels. However, since no language is known to distinguish all three, there is no separate IPA symbol for the mid vowel, and the symbol ⟨ɵ⟩ for the close-mid central rounded vowel is generally used instead. If precision is desired, the lowering diacritic can be used, ⟨ɵ̞⟩, or the more rounded diacritic with the schwa symbol, ⟨ə̹⟩, or the raising diacritic with the open-mid central rounded vowel symbol, ⟨ɞ̝⟩, although it is rare to use such precision.

Some of the vowels listed in the table below may phonetically be more front than typical central vowels, as near-front vowels. If precision is required, this may instead be called a mid near-front rounded vowel. For those which are more back than typical central vowels, see mid near-back rounded vowel.

=== Features ===
- Its vowel height is mid, which means the tongue is positioned halfway between a close vowel and an open vowel.
- Its vowel backness is central, which means the tongue is positioned halfway between a front vowel and a back vowel.
- It is rounded, which means that the lips are rounded rather than spread or relaxed.

=== Occurrence ===
Language		Word	IPA	Meaning	Notes
Afrikaans	Standard	lug	[lɞ̝χ]	'air'	Also described as open-mid [ɞ], typically transcribed in IPA with ⟨œ⟩. Many speakers merge /œ/ and /ə/, even in formal speech. See Afrikaans phonology
Danish	Standard	hoppe	[ˈhʌ̹pə̹]	'mare'	Possible realization of /ə/. See Danish phonology
Dutch	Southern	hut	[ɦɵ̞t]	'hut'	Found in certain accents, e.g. in Bruges. Close-mid [ɵ] in Standard Dutch. See Dutch phonology
English	California	foot	[fɵ̞ʔt]	'foot'	Part of the California vowel shift. Typically transcribed in IPA with ⟨ʊ⟩.
French		je	[ʒə̹]	'I'	Only somewhat rounded; may be transcribed in IPA with ⟨ə⟩ or ⟨ɵ⟩. Also described as close-mid [ɵ]. May be more front for a number of speakers. See French phonology
German	Chemnitz dialect	Wonne	[ˈv̞ɞ̝nə]	'bliss'	Typically transcribed in IPA with ⟨ɞ⟩.
Hiw		perët	[pə̹ret]	'bread'	
Irish	Munster	scoil	[skɞ̝lʲ]	'school'	Allophone of /ɔ/ between a broad and a slender consonant. See Irish phonology
Luxembourgish		dënn	[d̥ə̹n]	'thin'	Only slightly rounded; less often realized as unrounded [ə̜]. See Luxembourgish phonology
Norwegian	Urban East	nøtt	[nɞ̝tː]	'nut'	Also described as open-mid front [œʷ]; typically transcribed in IPA with ⟨œ⟩ or ⟨ø⟩. See Norwegian phonology
Plautdietsch	Canadian Old Colony	butzt	[bɵ̞t͡st]	'bumps'	Mid-centralized from [ʊ], to which it corresponds in other dialects.
Swedish	Central Standard	full	[fø̞̈lː]	'full'	Short form of [yː ~ ʏː], pronounced with compressed lips. Engstrand (1990) transcribes the pair as /ɵ ʉː/, placing the short vowel as mid [ø̞̈]. Later sources have contradicted this claim, describing the short vowel as close-mid [ø̈] or fully close [ÿ]. See Swedish phonology
Tajik	Northern dialects	кӯҳ/kūh	[kɵ̞h]	'mountain'	Typically described as close-mid [ɵ]. See Tajik phonology
Turkish		göz	[ɟœ̝̈z]	'eye'	Typical realization of the vowel transcribed with ⟨œ⟩. See Turkish phonology

== Notes ==
Place →	Labial					Coronal										Dorsal					Laryngeal			
Manner ↓	Bilabial		Labiodental		Linguolabial		Dental		Alveolar		Postalveolar		Retroflex		(Alveolo-)palatal		Velar		Uvular		Pharyngeal/epiglottal		Glottal	
Nasal	m̥	m	ɱ̊	ɱ		n̼	n̪̊	n̪	n̥	n	n̠̊	n̠	ɳ̊	ɳ	ɲ̊	ɲ	ŋ̊	ŋ	ɴ̥	ɴ				
Plosive	p	b	p̪	b̪	t̼	d̼	t̪	d̪	t	d			ʈ	ɖ	c	ɟ	k	ɡ	q	ɢ	ʡ		ʔ	
Sibilant affricate							t̪s̪	d̪z̪	ts	dz	t̠ʃ	d̠ʒ	tʂ	dʐ	tɕ	dʑ								
Non-sibilant affricate	pɸ	bβ	p̪f	b̪v			t̪θ	d̪ð	tɹ̝̊	dɹ̝	t̠ɹ̠̊˔	d̠ɹ̠˔			cç	ɟʝ	kx	ɡɣ	qχ	ɢʁ	ʡʜ	ʡʢ	ʔh	
Sibilant fricative							s̪	z̪	s	z	ʃ	ʒ	ʂ	ʐ	ɕ	ʑ								
Non-sibilant fricative	ɸ	β	f	v	θ̼	ð̼	θ	ð	θ̠	ð̠	ɹ̠̊˔	ɹ̠˔	ɻ̊˔	ɻ˔	ç	ʝ	x	ɣ	χ	ʁ	ħ	ʕ	h	ɦ
Approximant		β̞		ʋ				ð̞		ɹ		ɹ̠		ɻ		j		ɰ						˷
Tap/flap		ⱱ̟		ⱱ					ɾ̥	ɾ			ɽ̊	ɽ						ɢ̆		ʡ̆		
Trill	ʙ̥	ʙ							r̥	r		r̠	ɽ̊r̥	ɽr					ʀ̥	ʀ	ʜ	ʢ		
Lateral affricate									tɬ	dɮ			tꞎ	d𝼅	c𝼆	ɟʎ̝	k𝼄	ɡʟ̝						
Lateral fricative							ɬ̪		ɬ	ɮ			ꞎ	𝼅	𝼆	ʎ̝	𝼄	ʟ̝						
Lateral approximant								l̪	l̥	l		l̠	ɭ̊	ɭ	ʎ̥	ʎ	ʟ̥	ʟ		ʟ̠				
Lateral tap/flap									ɺ̥	ɺ			𝼈̊	𝼈		ʎ̆		ʟ̆						

		BL	LD	D	A	PA	RF	P	V	U
Implosive	Voiced	ɓ			ɗ		ᶑ	ʄ	ɠ	ʛ
Implosive	Voiceless	ɓ̥			ɗ̥		ᶑ̊	ʄ̊	ɠ̊	ʛ̥
Ejective	Stop	pʼ			tʼ		ʈʼ	cʼ	kʼ	qʼ
Ejective	Affricate		p̪fʼ	tθʼ	tsʼ	tʃʼ	tʂʼ	tɕʼ	kxʼ	qχʼ
Ejective	Fricative	ɸʼ	fʼ	θʼ	sʼ	ʃʼ	ʂʼ	ɕʼ	xʼ	χʼ
Ejective	Lateral affricate				tɬʼ			c𝼆ʼ	k𝼄ʼ	q𝼄ʼ
Ejective	Lateral fricative				ɬʼ					
Click (top: velar; bottom: uvular)	Tenuis	kʘ qʘ		kǀ qǀ	kǃ qǃ		k𝼊 q𝼊	kǂ qǂ		
Click (top: velar; bottom: uvular)	Voiced	ɡʘ ɢʘ		ɡǀ ɢǀ	ɡǃ ɢǃ		ɡ𝼊 ɢ𝼊	ɡǂ ɢǂ		
Click (top: velar; bottom: uvular)	Nasal	ŋʘ ɴʘ		ŋǀ ɴǀ	ŋǃ ɴǃ		ŋ𝼊 ɴ𝼊	ŋǂ ɴǂ	ʞ	
Click (top: velar; bottom: uvular)	Tenuis lateral				kǁ qǁ					
Click (top: velar; bottom: uvular)	Voiced lateral				ɡǁ ɢǁ					
Click (top: velar; bottom: uvular)	Nasal lateral				ŋǁ ɴǁ					
