= Near-close near-front unrounded vowel =

Vowel sound represented by ⟨ɪ⟩ in IPA

ɪ
- IPA number: 319

Audio sample
- source · help

Encoding
- Entity (decimal): &#618;
- Unicode (hex): U+026A
- X-SAMPA: I
- Braille: ⠌ (braille pattern dots-34)
Image

IPA: Vowels

	Front	Central	Back
Close	i y	ɨ ʉ	ɯ u
Near-close	ɪ ʏ		ʊ
Close-mid	e ø	ɘ ɵ	ɤ o
Mid	e̞ ø̞	ə	ɤ̞ o̞
Open-mid	ɛ œ	ɜ ɞ	ʌ ɔ
Near-open	æ	ɐ
Open	a ɶ	ä	ɑ ɒ

- IPA help
- audio
- full chart
- template

Legend: unrounded • rounded

The near-close near-front unrounded vowel, or near-high near-front unrounded vowel, is a type of vowel sound, used in some spoken languages. The symbol in the International Phonetic Alphabet that represents this sound is ⟨ɪ⟩ (a Latin small capital I). The International Phonetic Association advises serifs on the symbol's ends. Some sans-serif fonts do meet this typographic specification. Prior to 1989, there was an alternate IPA symbol for this sound, ⟨ɩ⟩ (a Latin iota); use of this symbol is no longer sanctioned by the IPA, though it may still be found in some modern writings.

The Handbook of the International Phonetic Association defines [ɪ] as a mid-centralized (lowered and centralized) close front unrounded vowel (transcribed [i̽] or [ï̞]), and the current official IPA name of the vowel transcribed with the symbol ⟨ɪ⟩ is a near-close near-front unrounded vowel.

However, some languages have a vowel that is somewhat lower than the canonical value of [ɪ], though it still fits the definition of a mid-centralized [i]. It occurs in some dialects of English (such as Californian, General American and Standard Southern British) as well as some other languages (such as Icelandic), and it can be narrowly transcribed with [ɪ̞] (a lowered ⟨ɪ⟩), [e̠] (a backed ⟨e⟩), or [ɘ̟] (a fronted ⟨ɘ⟩). For precision, this can be described as a close-mid near-front unrounded vowel.

Additionally, in some languages (such as Danish, Luxembourgish and Sotho), there is a fully front near-close unrounded vowel (a sound between cardinal ⟨i⟩ and ⟨e⟩), which can be transcribed in IPA with [ɪ̟], [i̞] or [e̝]. For precision, this can be described as a near-close front unrounded vowel, or near-high front unrounded vowel. There may be phonological reasons not to transcribe the fully front variant with the symbol ⟨ɪ⟩, which may incorrectly imply a relation to the close ⟨i⟩.

Sometimes, especially in broad transcription, this vowel is transcribed with a simpler symbol ⟨i⟩, which technically represents the close front unrounded vowel.

== Features ==
- Its vowel height is near-close, also known as near-high, which means the tongue is not quite so constricted as a close vowel (high vowel).
- Its vowel backness is front, which means the tongue is positioned forward in the mouth without creating a constriction that would be classified as a consonant. The prototypical [ɪ] is somewhat further back (near-front) than the neighboring cardinal vowels.
- It is unrounded, which means that the lips are not rounded.
Sagittal section of a vocal tract pronouncing the IPA sound ⟨ɪ⟩. Note that a wavy glottis in this diagram indicates a voiced sound.

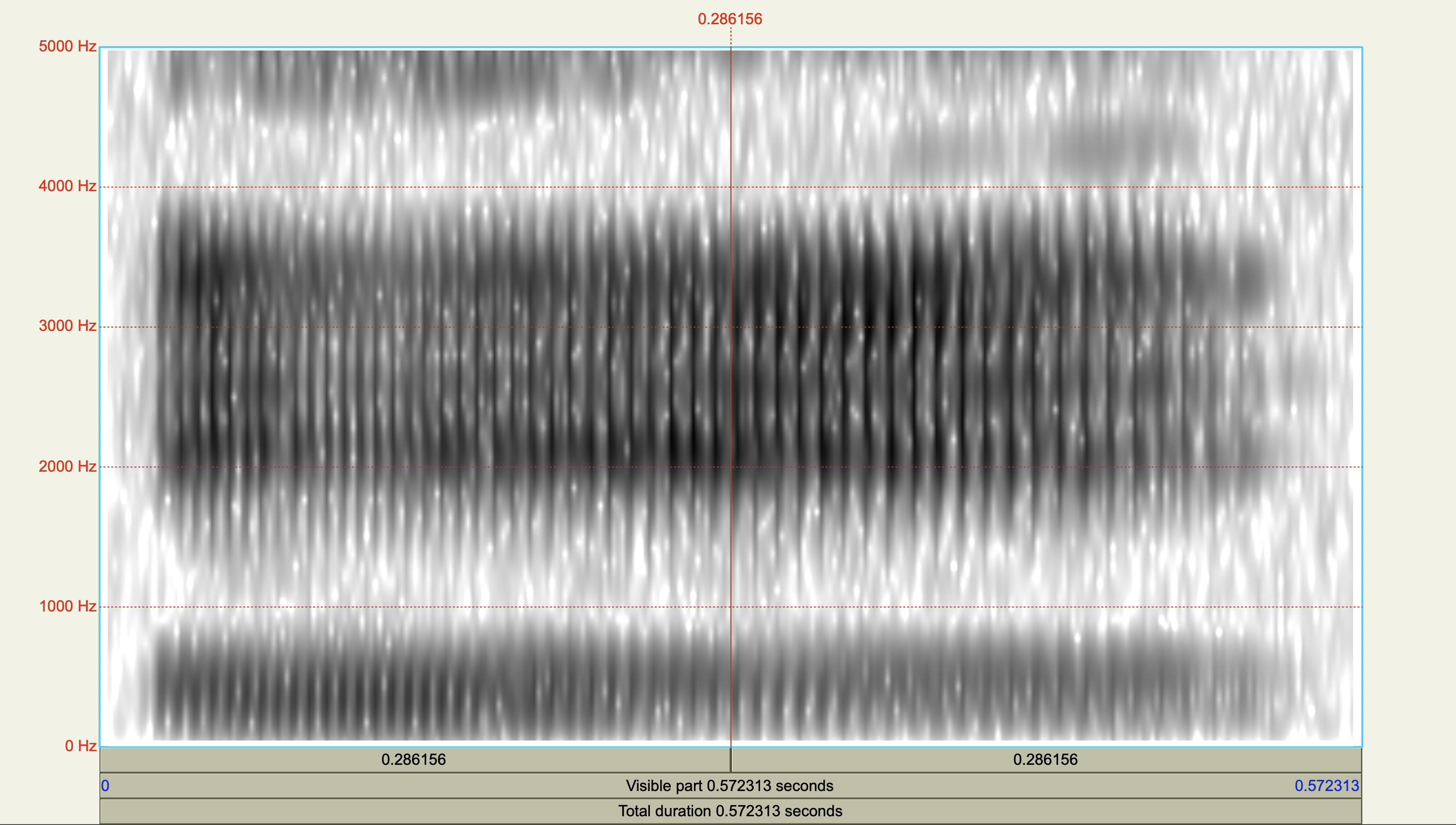
Spectrogram of [ɪ]

== Occurrence ==
Language		Word	IPA	Meaning	Notes
Abenaki		nis	[nɪs]	'two'	The quality varies between near-close [ɪ] and close [i]. See Abenaki phonology
Afrikaans	Standard	meter	[ˈmɪ̞ˑtɐr]	'meter'	Close-mid. Allophone of /ɪə/ in less stressed words and in stressed syllables of polysyllabic words. In the latter case, it is in free variation with the diphthongal realization [ɪə̯ ~ ɪ̯ə ~ ɪə]. See Afrikaans phonology
Arabic	Kuwaiti	بِنْت (bint)	[bɪnt]	'girl'	Corresponds to /i/ in Classical Arabic. Contrasts with /i/ or [iː] See Arabic phonology
Arabic	Lebanese	اكَلِت (akalit)	[ækælɪt]	'she ate'	Corresponds to /i/ in Classical Arabic. Contrasts with /i/ or [iː] See Arabic phonology
Burmese		မြစ် (mracʻ)	[mjɪʔ]	'root'	Allophone of /i/ in syllables closed by a glottal stop and when nasalized.
Catalan	Balearic	mirar	[mɪˈɾɑ(ɾ)]	'to look'	Unstressed allophone of /i/. See Catalan phonology
Catalan	Valencian	mirar	[mɪˈɾɑ(ɾ)]	'to look'	Unstressed allophone of /i/
Catalan	Valencian	naixement	[nɐjɕɪˈmẽn̪t̪]	'birth'	Unstressed allophone of /e/ in the suffix -ixement. In non-standard variants also in contact with palatals and sometimes initial /es-/. See Catalan phonology
Chinese	Shanghainese	一 (ih)	[ɪ̞ʔ˥]	'one'	Close-mid; appears only in closed syllables. Phonetically, it is nearly identical to /ɛ/ ([e̠]), which appears only in open syllables.
Czech	Bohemian	byli	[ˈbɪlɪ]	'they were'	The quality has been variously described as near-close near-front [ɪ] and close-mid front [ɪ̟˕]. It corresponds to close front [i] in Moravian Czech. See Czech phonology
Danish	Standard	hel	[ˈhe̝ːˀl]	'whole'	Fully front; contrasts close, near-close and close-mid front unrounded vowels. It is typically transcribed in IPA with ⟨eː⟩ - the way it is pronounced in the conservative variety. The Danish vowel transcribed in IPA with ⟨ɪ⟩ is pronounced similarly to the short /e/. See Danish phonology
Dutch	Standard	blik	[blɪk]	'glance'	The Standard Northern realization is near-close [ɪ], but the Standard Belgian realization has also been described as close-mid [ɪ̞]. Some regional dialects have a vowel that is slightly closer to the cardinal [i]. See Dutch phonology
English	Californian	bit	[bɪ̞t]	'bit'	Close-mid. See English phonology
English	General American	bit	[bɪ̞t]	'bit'	Close-mid. See English phonology
English	Estuary	bit	[bɪʔt]	'bit'	Can be fully front [ɪ̟], near-front [ɪ] or close-mid [ɪ̞], with other realizations also being possible.
English	Received Pronunciation	bit	[bɪʔt]	'bit'	Close-mid [ɪ̞] for younger speakers, near-close [ɪ] for older speakers.
English	General Australian	bit	[bɪ̟t]	'bit'	Fully front; also described as close [i]. See Australian English phonology
English	Inland Northern American	bit	[bɪt]	'bit'	The quality varies between near-close near-front [ɪ], near-close central [ɪ̈], close-mid near-front [ɪ̞] and close-mid central [ɘ].
English	Philadelphian	bit	[bɪt]	'bit'	The height varies between near-close [ɪ] and close-mid [ɪ̞].
English	Welsh	bit	[bɪt]	'bit'	Near-close [ɪ] in Abercrave and Port Talbot, close-mid [ɪ̞] in Cardiff.
English	New Zealand	bed	[be̝d]	'bed'	The quality varies between near-close front [e̝], near-close near-front [ɪ], close-mid front [e] and close-mid near-front [e̠]. It is typically transcribed in IPA with ⟨e⟩. In the cultivated variety, it is mid [e̞]. See New Zealand English phonology
English	Some Australian speakers	bed	[be̝d]	'bed'	Close-mid [e] in General Australian, may be even lower for some other speakers. See Australian English phonology
English	Some South African speakers	bed	[be̝d]	'bed'	Used by some General and Broad speakers. In the Broad variety, it is usually lower [ɛ], whereas in the General variety, it can be close-mid [e] instead. Typically transcribed in IPA with ⟨e⟩. See South African English phonology
French	Quebec	petite	[pət͡sɪt]	'small'	Allophone of /i/ in closed syllables. See Quebec French phonology
German	Standard	bitte	[ˈb̥ɪ̞tə]	'please'	Close-mid; for some speakers, it may be as high as [i]. See Standard German phonology
Hindustani	Hindi	दिल (dil)	[d̪ɪl]	'heart'	Hindustani phonology
Hindustani	Urdu	دل (dil)	[d̪ɪl]	'heart'	Hindustani phonology
Hiw		qr̄ē	[kʷg͡ʟɪ]	'dolphin'	Contrasts both with /i/ and with /e/.
Hungarian		visz	[vɪs]	'to carry'	Typically transcribed in IPA with ⟨i⟩. See Hungarian phonology
Icelandic		vinur	[ˈʋɪ̞ːnʏ̞ɾ]	'friend'	Close-mid. See Icelandic phonology
Kabiye		kabɩyɛ	[kàbɪ̀jɛ̀]	'Kabiye'	-ATR front vowel. See Kabiye language
Kazakh		бір (bır)	[bɪ̞ɾ]	'one'	Close-mid. See Kazakh phonology
Limburgish		hin	[ɦɪ̞n]	'chicken'	Near-close [ɪ] or close-mid [ɪ̞], depending on the dialect. The example word is from the Maastrichtian dialect.
Luxembourgish		Been	[be̝ːn]	'leg'	Fully front. Typically transcribed in IPA with ⟨eː⟩. See Luxembourgish phonology
Malay		kecil	[kət͡ʃɪl]	'small'	Allophone of /i/ in closed-final syllables. May be [e] or [e̞] depending on the speaker. See Malay phonology
Norwegian		litt	[lɪ̟tː]	'a little'	The example word is from Urban East Norwegian, in which the vowel has been variously described as near-close front [ɪ̟] and close front [i]. See Norwegian phonology
Portuguese	Brazilian	cine	[ˈsinɪ]	'cine'	Reduction and neutralization of unstressed /e/ (can be epenthetic), /ɛ/ and /i/. Can be voiceless. See Portuguese phonology
Russian		дерево (derevo)	[ˈdʲerʲɪvə]	'tree'	Backness varies between fully front and near-front. It occurs only in unstressed syllables. See Russian phonology
Saterland Frisian		Dee	[de̝ː]	'dough'	Phonetic realization of /eː/ and /ɪ/. Near-close front [e̝ː] in the former case, close-mid near-front [ɪ̞] in the latter. Phonetically, the latter is nearly identical to /ɛː/ ([e̠ː]).
Scottish Gaelic		fios	[fɪs̪]	'information'	Allophone of /i/ before broad consonants and in unstressed syllables.
Sicilian		unni	[ˈunnɪ]	'Where'	Unstressed allophone of [i]. See Sicilian vowel system
Sinhala		පිරිමි (pirimi)	[ˈpi̞ɾi̞mi̞]	'male'	Fully front; typically transcribed in IPA with ⟨i⟩.
Slovak		rýchly	[ˈri̞ːxli̞]	'fast'	Typically fully front. See Slovak phonology
Sotho		ho leka	[hʊ̠lɪ̟kʼɑ̈]	'to attempt'	Fully front; contrasts close, near-close and close-mid front unrounded vowels. See Sotho phonology
Spanish	Eastern Andalusian	mis	[mɪ̟ː]	'my' (pl.)	Fully front. It corresponds to [i] in other dialects, but in these dialects they are distinct. See Spanish phonology
Spanish	Murcian	mis	[mɪ̟ː]	'my' (pl.)	Fully front. It corresponds to [i] in other dialects, but in these dialects they are distinct. See Spanish phonology
Swedish	Central Standard	sill	[s̪ɪ̟l̪ː]	'herring'	The quality has been variously described as close-mid front [ɪ̟˕], near-close front [ɪ̟] and close front [i]. See Swedish phonology
Temne		pim	[pí̞m]	'pick'	Fully front; typically transcribed in IPA with ⟨i⟩.
Turkish		müşteri	[my̠ʃt̪ɛ̞ˈɾɪ]	'customer'	Allophone of /i/ described variously as "word-final" and "occurring in final open syllable of a phrase". See Turkish phonology
Ukrainian		ирій (yrij)	[ɪrij]	'Iriy'	See Ukrainian phonology
Welsh		mynydd	[mənɪð]	'mountain'	See Welsh phonology
Yoruba		kini	[kĩi]	'what'	Fully front; typically transcribed in IPA with ⟨ĩ⟩. It is nasalized, and may be close [ĩ] instead.

== Notes ==
Place →	Labial					Coronal										Dorsal					Laryngeal			
Manner ↓	Bilabial		Labiodental		Linguolabial		Dental		Alveolar		Postalveolar		Retroflex		(Alveolo-)palatal		Velar		Uvular		Pharyngeal/epiglottal		Glottal	
Nasal	m̥	m	ɱ̊	ɱ		n̼	n̪̊	n̪	n̥	n	n̠̊	n̠	ɳ̊	ɳ	ɲ̊	ɲ	ŋ̊	ŋ	ɴ̥	ɴ				
Plosive	p	b	p̪	b̪	t̼	d̼	t̪	d̪	t	d			ʈ	ɖ	c	ɟ	k	ɡ	q	ɢ	ʡ		ʔ	
Sibilant affricate							t̪s̪	d̪z̪	ts	dz	t̠ʃ	d̠ʒ	tʂ	dʐ	tɕ	dʑ								
Non-sibilant affricate	pɸ	bβ	p̪f	b̪v			t̪θ	d̪ð	tɹ̝̊	dɹ̝	t̠ɹ̠̊˔	d̠ɹ̠˔			cç	ɟʝ	kx	ɡɣ	qχ	ɢʁ	ʡʜ	ʡʢ	ʔh	
Sibilant fricative							s̪	z̪	s	z	ʃ	ʒ	ʂ	ʐ	ɕ	ʑ								
Non-sibilant fricative	ɸ	β	f	v	θ̼	ð̼	θ	ð	θ̠	ð̠	ɹ̠̊˔	ɹ̠˔	ɻ̊˔	ɻ˔	ç	ʝ	x	ɣ	χ	ʁ	ħ	ʕ	h	ɦ
Approximant		β̞		ʋ				ð̞		ɹ		ɹ̠		ɻ		j		ɰ						˷
Tap/flap		ⱱ̟		ⱱ					ɾ̥	ɾ			ɽ̊	ɽ						ɢ̆		ʡ̆		
Trill	ʙ̥	ʙ							r̥	r		r̠	ɽ̊r̥	ɽr					ʀ̥	ʀ	ʜ	ʢ		
Lateral affricate									tɬ	dɮ			tꞎ	d𝼅	c𝼆	ɟʎ̝	k𝼄	ɡʟ̝						
Lateral fricative							ɬ̪		ɬ	ɮ			ꞎ	𝼅	𝼆	ʎ̝	𝼄	ʟ̝						
Lateral approximant								l̪	l̥	l		l̠	ɭ̊	ɭ	ʎ̥	ʎ	ʟ̥	ʟ		ʟ̠				
Lateral tap/flap									ɺ̥	ɺ			𝼈̊	𝼈		ʎ̆		ʟ̆						

		BL	LD	D	A	PA	RF	P	V	U
Implosive	Voiced	ɓ			ɗ		ᶑ	ʄ	ɠ	ʛ
Implosive	Voiceless	ɓ̥			ɗ̥		ᶑ̊	ʄ̊	ɠ̊	ʛ̥
Ejective	Stop	pʼ			tʼ		ʈʼ	cʼ	kʼ	qʼ
Ejective	Affricate		p̪fʼ	t̪θʼ	tsʼ	t̠ʃʼ	tʂʼ	tɕʼ	kxʼ	qχʼ
Ejective	Fricative	ɸʼ	fʼ	θʼ	sʼ	ʃʼ	ʂʼ	ɕʼ	xʼ	χʼ
Ejective	Lateral affricate				tɬʼ			c𝼆ʼ	k𝼄ʼ	q𝼄ʼ
Ejective	Lateral fricative				ɬʼ					
Click (top: velar; bottom: uvular)	Tenuis	kʘ qʘ		kǀ qǀ	kǃ qǃ		k𝼊 q𝼊	kǂ qǂ		
Click (top: velar; bottom: uvular)	Voiced	ɡʘ ɢʘ		ɡǀ ɢǀ	ɡǃ ɢǃ		ɡ𝼊 ɢ𝼊	ɡǂ ɢǂ		
Click (top: velar; bottom: uvular)	Nasal	ŋʘ ɴʘ		ŋǀ ɴǀ	ŋǃ ɴǃ		ŋ𝼊 ɴ𝼊	ŋǂ ɴǂ	ʞ	
Click (top: velar; bottom: uvular)	Tenuis lateral				kǁ qǁ					
Click (top: velar; bottom: uvular)	Voiced lateral				ɡǁ ɢǁ					
Click (top: velar; bottom: uvular)	Nasal lateral				ŋǁ ɴǁ					
