= Mid back unrounded vowel =

Vowel sound represented by ⟨ɤ̞⟩ or ⟨ʌ̝⟩ in IPA

ɤ̞

ʌ̝
- IPA number: 315 430

Audio sample
- source · help

Encoding
- Entity (decimal): &#612;&#798;
- Unicode (hex): U+0264 U+031E

IPA: Vowels

	Front	Central	Back
Close	i y	ɨ ʉ	ɯ u
Near-close	ɪ ʏ		ʊ
Close-mid	e ø	ɘ ɵ	ɤ o
Mid	e̞ ø̞	ə	ɤ̞ o̞
Open-mid	ɛ œ	ɜ ɞ	ʌ ɔ
Near-open	æ	ɐ
Open	a ɶ	ä	ɑ ɒ

- IPA help
- audio
- full chart
- template

Legend: unrounded • rounded

The mid back unrounded vowel is a type of vowel sound, used in some spoken languages. There is no dedicated symbol in the International Phonetic Alphabet that represents the exact mid back unrounded vowel between close-mid [ɤ] and open-mid [ʌ], because no language is known to distinguish all three, but ⟨ɤ⟩ is normally used. If more precision is desired, diacritics can be used, such as ⟨ɤ̞⟩ or ⟨ʌ̝⟩.

Some of the vowels listed in the table below may phonetically be more front than typical back vowels, as near-back vowels. If precision is required, this may instead be called a mid near-back unrounded vowel.

== Features ==
- Its vowel height is mid, which means the tongue is positioned halfway between a close vowel and an open vowel.
- Its vowel backness is back, which means the tongue is positioned back in the mouth without creating a constriction that would be classified as a consonant. Unrounded back vowels tend to be centralized, which means that often they are in fact near-back.
- It is unrounded, which means that the lips are not rounded.

== Occurrence ==
Language		Word	IPA	Meaning	Notes
Bulgarian		път	[pɤ̞t̪]	'path'	Typically transcribed in IPA with ⟨ɤ⟩. in broad transcriptions. See Bulgarian phonology
Chinese	Shanghainese	渠	[kɤ̞˩]	'ditch'	Tends to be diphthongized to [ɤ̞ɯ̞] by younger speakers.
English	Cardiff	plus	[pl̥ʌ̝s]	'plus'	May be [ə], [ɜ], [ɜ̟] or [ë̞] instead. It corresponds to [ʌ] in other dialects. Typically transcribed in IPA with ⟨ʌ⟩.
English	Norfolk	plus	[pl̥ʌ̝s]	'plus'	Corresponds to [ʌ] in other dialects. Typically transcribed in IPA with ⟨ʌ⟩. See English phonology
English	Philadelphia	plus	[pɫ̥ʌ̝s]	'plus'	May be either open-mid [ʌ] or a lowered and unrounded /uː/ ([ɯ̽]) instead. It corresponds to [ʌ] in other dialects. Typically transcribed in IPA with ⟨ʌ⟩. See English phonology
Gayo		kule	[kuˈlɤ̞ː]	'tiger'	One of the possible allophones of /ə/.
German	Chemnitz dialect	Schirm	[ʃʌ̝ˤːm]	'umbrella'	Pharyngealized; may be an opening diphthong [ɪːɒ̯] instead.
Ibibio		[dʌ̝k˦]		'enter'	Typically transcribed in IPA with ⟨ʌ⟩.
Marathi	some speakers	अननस / ananas	[ʌ̝n̪̺ʌ̝n̪̺ʌ̝s]	'pineapple'	Typically transcribed in IPA with ⟨ə⟩.
Vietnamese	Hanoi	tờ	[t̻ɤ̞˧˨]	'sheet'	Realization of /ɤ/ (also transcribed in IPA with ⟨ə⟩) according to Kirby (2011). See Vietnamese phonology

== See also ==
- Index of phonetics articles

== Notes ==
Place →	Labial					Coronal										Dorsal					Laryngeal			
Manner ↓	Bilabial		Labiodental		Linguolabial		Dental		Alveolar		Postalveolar		Retroflex		(Alveolo-)palatal		Velar		Uvular		Pharyngeal/epiglottal		Glottal	
Nasal	m̥	m	ɱ̊	ɱ		n̼	n̪̊	n̪	n̥	n	n̠̊	n̠	ɳ̊	ɳ	ɲ̊	ɲ	ŋ̊	ŋ	ɴ̥	ɴ				
Plosive	p	b	p̪	b̪	t̼	d̼	t̪	d̪	t	d			ʈ	ɖ	c	ɟ	k	ɡ	q	ɢ	ʡ		ʔ	
Sibilant affricate							t̪s̪	d̪z̪	ts	dz	t̠ʃ	d̠ʒ	tʂ	dʐ	tɕ	dʑ								
Non-sibilant affricate	pɸ	bβ	p̪f	b̪v			t̪θ	d̪ð	tɹ̝̊	dɹ̝	t̠ɹ̠̊˔	d̠ɹ̠˔			cç	ɟʝ	kx	ɡɣ	qχ	ɢʁ	ʡʜ	ʡʢ	ʔh	
Sibilant fricative							s̪	z̪	s	z	ʃ	ʒ	ʂ	ʐ	ɕ	ʑ								
Non-sibilant fricative	ɸ	β	f	v	θ̼	ð̼	θ	ð	θ̠	ð̠	ɹ̠̊˔	ɹ̠˔	ɻ̊˔	ɻ˔	ç	ʝ	x	ɣ	χ	ʁ	ħ	ʕ	h	ɦ
Approximant		β̞		ʋ				ð̞		ɹ		ɹ̠		ɻ		j		ɰ						˷
Tap/flap		ⱱ̟		ⱱ					ɾ̥	ɾ			ɽ̊	ɽ						ɢ̆		ʡ̆		
Trill	ʙ̥	ʙ							r̥	r		r̠	ɽ̊r̥	ɽr					ʀ̥	ʀ	ʜ	ʢ		
Lateral affricate									tɬ	dɮ			tꞎ	d𝼅	c𝼆	ɟʎ̝	k𝼄	ɡʟ̝						
Lateral fricative							ɬ̪		ɬ	ɮ			ꞎ	𝼅	𝼆	ʎ̝	𝼄	ʟ̝						
Lateral approximant								l̪	l̥	l		l̠	ɭ̊	ɭ	ʎ̥	ʎ	ʟ̥	ʟ		ʟ̠				
Lateral tap/flap									ɺ̥	ɺ			𝼈̊	𝼈		ʎ̆		ʟ̆						

		BL	LD	D	A	PA	RF	P	V	U
Implosive	Voiced	ɓ			ɗ		ᶑ	ʄ	ɠ	ʛ
Implosive	Voiceless	ɓ̥			ɗ̥		ᶑ̊	ʄ̊	ɠ̊	ʛ̥
Ejective	Stop	pʼ			tʼ		ʈʼ	cʼ	kʼ	qʼ
Ejective	Affricate		p̪fʼ	tθʼ	tsʼ	tʃʼ	tʂʼ	tɕʼ	kxʼ	qχʼ
Ejective	Fricative	ɸʼ	fʼ	θʼ	sʼ	ʃʼ	ʂʼ	ɕʼ	xʼ	χʼ
Ejective	Lateral affricate				tɬʼ			c𝼆ʼ	k𝼄ʼ	q𝼄ʼ
Ejective	Lateral fricative				ɬʼ					
Click (top: velar; bottom: uvular)	Tenuis	kʘ qʘ		kǀ qǀ	kǃ qǃ		k𝼊 q𝼊	kǂ qǂ		
Click (top: velar; bottom: uvular)	Voiced	ɡʘ ɢʘ		ɡǀ ɢǀ	ɡǃ ɢǃ		ɡ𝼊 ɢ𝼊	ɡǂ ɢǂ		
Click (top: velar; bottom: uvular)	Nasal	ŋʘ ɴʘ		ŋǀ ɴǀ	ŋǃ ɴǃ		ŋ𝼊 ɴ𝼊	ŋǂ ɴǂ	ʞ	
Click (top: velar; bottom: uvular)	Tenuis lateral				kǁ qǁ					
Click (top: velar; bottom: uvular)	Voiced lateral				ɡǁ ɢǁ					
Click (top: velar; bottom: uvular)	Nasal lateral				ŋǁ ɴǁ					
