= Open-mid back rounded vowel =

Vowel sound represented by ⟨ɔ⟩ in IPA

ɔ
- IPA number: 306

Audio sample
- source · help

Encoding
- Entity (decimal): &#596;
- Unicode (hex): U+0254
- X-SAMPA: O
- Braille: ⠣ (braille pattern dots-126)
Image

IPA: Vowels

	Front	Central	Back
Close	i y	ɨ ʉ	ɯ u
Near-close	ɪ ʏ		ʊ
Close-mid	e ø	ɘ ɵ	ɤ o
Mid	e̞ ø̞	ə	ɤ̞ o̞
Open-mid	ɛ œ	ɜ ɞ	ʌ ɔ
Near-open	æ	ɐ
Open	a ɶ	ä	ɑ ɒ

- IPA help
- audio
- full chart
- template

Legend: unrounded • rounded

The open-mid back rounded vowel, or low-mid back rounded vowel, is a type of vowel sound, used in some spoken languages. The symbol in the International Phonetic Alphabet that represents this sound is ⟨ɔ⟩. The IPA symbol is a turned letter c and both the symbol and the sound are commonly called "open-o". The name open-o represents the sound, in that it is like the sound represented by ⟨o⟩, the close-mid back rounded vowel, except it is more open. It also represents the symbol, which can be remembered as an o which has been "opened" by removing part of the closed circular shape.

In English, the symbol ⟨ɔ⟩ (or ⟨ɔː⟩) is typically associated with the vowel in "thought", but in Received Pronunciation ("RP", standard British English), Australian English, New Zealand English and South African English that vowel is produced with considerably stronger lip rounding and higher tongue position than that of cardinal [ɔ], i.e. as close-mid [oː] or somewhat lower. Open-mid [ɔː] or even open [ɒː] realizations are found in North American English (where words with this vowel are often merged with words with the open back unrounded vowel) and Scottish English as well as Hiberno-English, Northern England English and Welsh English, though in the last three accent groups closer, [oː]-like realizations are also found. In RP, the open-mid realization of /ɔː/ has been obsolete since the 1930s. Pronouncing that vowel as such is subject to correction for non-native speakers aiming at RP.

In Received Pronunciation and Australian English, the open-mid back rounded vowel occurs as the main allophone of the LOT vowel /ɒ/. The contrast between /ɔː/ and /ɒ/ is thus strongly maintained, with the former vowel being realized as close-mid [oː] and the latter as open-mid [ɔ], similarly to the contrast between /o/ and /ɔ/ found in German, Italian and Portuguese.

== Features ==
- Its vowel height is open-mid, also known as low-mid, which means the tongue is positioned halfway between an open vowel (a low vowel) and a mid vowel.
- Its vowel backness is back, which means the tongue is positioned back in the mouth without creating a constriction that would be classified as a consonant.
- Its place of articulation is pharyngeal, which means it is articulated with the tongue root against the back of the throat (the pharynx).
- Its roundedness is protruded, which means that the corners of the lips are drawn together, and the inner surfaces exposed.

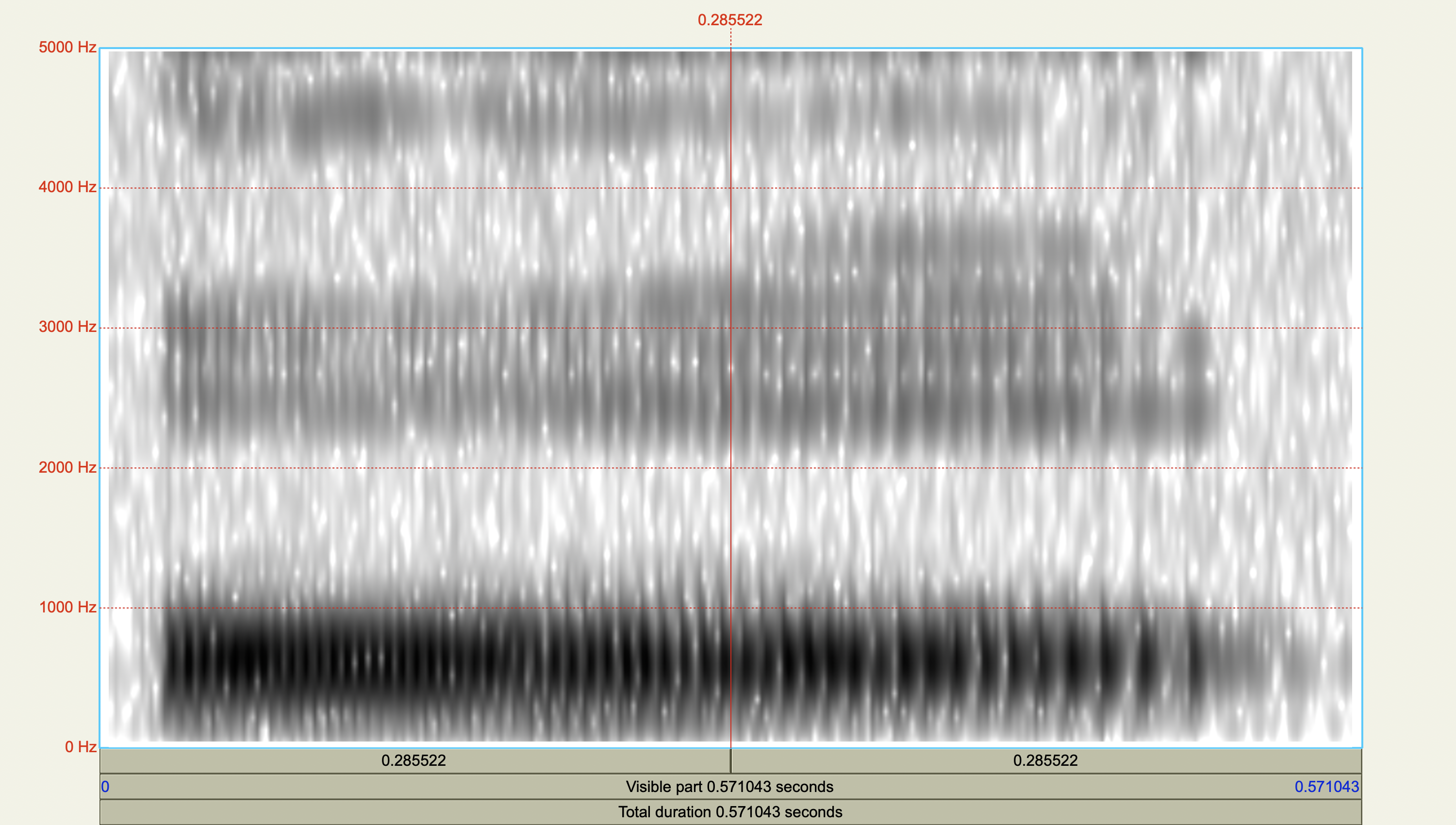
Spectrogram of [ɔ]

== Occurrence ==
Language		Word	IPA	Meaning	Notes
Albanian	Tosk	tortë	[ˈtɔɾtə]	'cake'	
Armenian	Eastern	հողմ hoġm	[hɔʁm]	'storm'	
Assamese		কৰ / kor	[kɔɹ]	'to do'	May also be transcribed as fully low [ɒ] or "over-rounded" [ɒ̹]
Bavarian	Amstetten dialect	wås	[β̞ɔs]	'what'	Contrasts close [u], near-close [o̝], close-mid [o] and open-mid [ɔ] back rounded vowels in addition to the open central unrounded [ä]. Typically transcribed in IPA with ⟨ɒ⟩.
Bengali		অর্থ	[ɔɾt̪t̪ʰo]	'meaning'	See Bengali phonology
Breton		roll	[ˈrɔlː]	'list'	
Bulgarian		род rod	[rɔt̪]	'kin'	See Bulgarian phonology
Catalan	Most dialects	soc	[ˈs̺ɔk]	'clog'	Lower ([ɒ]) and/or unrounded ([ɑ]) in Valencian and some Balearic subdialects. See Catalan phonology
Chinese	Cantonese	我 ngo^{5}	[ŋɔː˩˧]	'I, me, my'	See Cantonese phonology
Chinese	Hokkien	某 bó͘	[bɔ⁵²]	'wife'	See Hokkien phonology
Cipu	Tirisino dialect	kødø	[kɔ̟̀ɗɔ̟́]	'cut down!'	Near-back.
Czech		co	[t͡sɔ]	'what'	See Czech phonology
Danish	Standard	kort	[ˈkʰɔːt]	'map'	Most often transcribed in IPA with ⟨ɒː⟩. See Danish phonology
Dutch	Standard Belgian	och	[ʔɔˤx]	'alas'	'Very tense, with strong lip-rounding', strongly pharyngealized (although less so in standard Belgian) and somewhat fronted. See Dutch phonology
Dutch	Standard Northern	och	[ʔɔˤx]	'alas'	'Very tense, with strong lip-rounding', strongly pharyngealized (although less so in standard Belgian) and somewhat fronted. See Dutch phonology
English	Australian	not	[nɔt]	'not'	See Australian English phonology
English	Estuary	not	[nɔt]	'not'	
English	New Zealand	not	[nɔt]	'not'	May be somewhat fronted. Often transcribed in IPA with ⟨ɒ⟩. See New Zealand English phonology
English	Received Pronunciation	not	[nɔt]	'not'	/ɒ/ has shifted up in emerging RP.
English	General American	thought	[θɔt]	'thought'	Mainly in speakers without the cot–caught merger. It may be lower [ɒ]. (It is rarely lowered to /ɒ/ before liquids /l ɹ/, and may thus be more familiar to many North Americans in r-colored form, /ɔ˞/.)
English	Scottish	thought	[θɔt]	'thought'	Most Scottish dialects exhibit the cot–caught merger, the outcome of which is a vowel of [ɔ] quality.
English	Sheffield	goat	[ɡɔːt]	'goat'	Common realization of the GOAT vowel particularly for males.
English	Newfoundland	but	[bɔt]	'but'	Less commonly unrounded [ʌ]. See English phonology
Faroese		lálla	[ˈlɔtla]	'seal flipper'	See Faroese phonology
French	Parisian	sotte	[sɔt]	'silly' (f.)	The Parisian realization has been variously described as a back vowel [ɔ] centralized to [ɞ] before /ʁ/ and central [ɞ]. See French phonology
Galician		home	[ˈɔmɪ]	'man'	See Galician phonology
Georgian		სწორი stsori	[st͡sʼɔɾi]	'correct'	
German	Standard	voll	[fɔl]	'full'	See Standard German phonology
Hindustani	Hindi	मुहब्बत(mohobbat)	[mɔɦɔbbət̪]	'love','affection'	See Hindustani phonology.
Hindustani	Urdu	محبت(mohobbat)	[mɔɦɔbbət̪]	'love','affection'	See Hindustani phonology.
Italian		parola	[päˈrɔ̟ːlä]	'word'	Near-back. See Italian phonology
Javanese		ꦫꦱ / råså	[rɔsɔ]	taste, feeling	
Kaingang		pó	[ˈpɔ]	'stone'	
Kera		[dɔ̟̀l]		'hard earth'	Near-back.
Kokborok		kwrwi	[kɔrɔi]	'not'	
Korean	North Korean	조선 / Chosŏn	[t͡sɔsɔn]	'North Korea'	Both ㅓ /ʌ/ and ㅗ /o/ in South Korean have merged into [ɔ] in North Korean. See Korean phonology
Kashmiri		گۄلاب، وۄزُل / gɔlāb, wɔzul	[ɡɔlaːb], [wɔzul]	'rose', 'red'	The letter ۄ represents the open-mid back rounded vowel [ɔ] in Kashmiri phonology.
Limburgish		mòn	[mɔːn]	'moon'	Lower [ɔ̞ː] in the Maastrichtian dialect. The example word is from the Hasselt dialect.
Lower Sorbian		pšosba	[ˈpʂɔz̪bä]	'a request'	
Low German	Most dialects	stok	[stɔk]	'stick'	May be more open [ɒ] in the Netherlands or more closed [o̞] in Low Prussian dialects.
Low German	Various dialects	slaap	[slɔːp]	'sleep'	May be as low as [ɒː] and as high as [oː] in other dialects.
Low German	Southern Eastphalian	brâd	[brɔːt]	'bread'	Corresponds to [oː], [ou̯], [ɔu̯], [ɛo̯] in other dialects.
Luxembourgish		Sonn	[zɔn]	'son'	Possible realization of /o/. See Luxembourgish phonology
Malay	Standard	sotong	[sotɔŋ]	'squid'	Possible realization of /o/ and /u/ in closed final syllables. See Malay phonology
Malay	Negeri Sembilan	كيت / kita	[kitɔ]	'we' (inclusive)	See Negeri Sembilan Malay
Malay	Kelantan-Pattani	بياسا / biasa	[bɛsɔ]	'normal'	See Kelatan-Pattani Malay
Nepali		पर	[pɔ̜ɾɔ̜]	'far'	Less rounded. Allophone of /ʌ/ around labial consonants and in isolation.
Nepali		लामो	[lämɔ]	'long'	Uncommon post-nasal allophone of /o/, which is commonly raised to [u].
Norwegian	Some dialects	så	[sɔː]	'so'	Present e.g. in Telemark; realized as mid [ɔ̝ː] in other dialects. See Norwegian phonology
Occitan		òda	[ɔðɔ]	'ode'	See Occitan phonology
Odia		ଅର୍ଥ	[ɔɾtʰɔ]	'meaning'	
Polish		kot	[kɔt̪]	'cat'	See Polish phonology
Portuguese	Most dialects	fofoca	[fɔˈfɔ̞kɐ]	'gossip'	Stressed vowel might be lower. The presence and use of other unstressed ⟨o⟩ allophones, such as [o̞ o ʊ u], varies according to dialect.
Portuguese	Some speakers	bronca	[ˈbɾɔ̃kə]	'scolding'	Stressed vowel, allophone of nasal vowel /õ̞/. See Portuguese phonology
Russian	Some speakers	сухой sukhoy	[s̪ʊˈxɔj]	'dry'	More commonly realized as mid [o̞]. See Russian phonology
Slovak	Standard	ohúriť	[ˈɔɦu̞ːric]	'to stun'	See Slovak phonology
Swedish	Standard	moll	[mɔl]	'minor scale'	See Swedish phonology
Tagalog		oyayi	[ʔɔˈjajɪ]	'lullaby'	See Tagalog phonology
Thai		งอ ngo	[ŋɔː˧]	'to bend'	See Thai phonology
Temne		pɔn	[pɔ̟̀n]	'swamp'	Near-back.
Ukrainian		любов lyubov	[lʲuˈbɔw]	'love'	See Ukrainian phonology
Upper Sorbian		pos	[pɔs̪]	'dog'	See Upper Sorbian phonology
Welsh		siop	[ʃɔp]	'shop'	See Welsh phonology
West Frisian		rôt	[rɔːt]	'rat'	See West Frisian phonology
Yiddish		יאָ yo	[jɔ]	'yes'	See Yiddish phonology.
Yoruba					Nasalized; may be near-open [ɔ̞̃] instead.

== See also ==
- Open O
- Index of phonetics articles
- R-colored vowel

== Notes ==
Place →	Labial					Coronal										Dorsal					Laryngeal			
Manner ↓	Bilabial		Labiodental		Linguolabial		Dental		Alveolar		Postalveolar		Retroflex		(Alveolo-)palatal		Velar		Uvular		Pharyngeal/epiglottal		Glottal	
Nasal	m̥	m	ɱ̊	ɱ		n̼	n̪̊	n̪	n̥	n	n̠̊	n̠	ɳ̊	ɳ	ɲ̊	ɲ	ŋ̊	ŋ	ɴ̥	ɴ				
Plosive	p	b	p̪	b̪	t̼	d̼	t̪	d̪	t	d			ʈ	ɖ	c	ɟ	k	ɡ	q	ɢ	ʡ		ʔ	
Sibilant affricate							t̪s̪	d̪z̪	ts	dz	t̠ʃ	d̠ʒ	tʂ	dʐ	tɕ	dʑ								
Non-sibilant affricate	pɸ	bβ	p̪f	b̪v			t̪θ	d̪ð	tɹ̝̊	dɹ̝	t̠ɹ̠̊˔	d̠ɹ̠˔			cç	ɟʝ	kx	ɡɣ	qχ	ɢʁ	ʡʜ	ʡʢ	ʔh	
Sibilant fricative							s̪	z̪	s	z	ʃ	ʒ	ʂ	ʐ	ɕ	ʑ								
Non-sibilant fricative	ɸ	β	f	v	θ̼	ð̼	θ	ð	θ̠	ð̠	ɹ̠̊˔	ɹ̠˔	ɻ̊˔	ɻ˔	ç	ʝ	x	ɣ	χ	ʁ	ħ	ʕ	h	ɦ
Approximant		β̞		ʋ				ð̞		ɹ		ɹ̠		ɻ		j		ɰ						˷
Tap/flap		ⱱ̟		ⱱ					ɾ̥	ɾ			ɽ̊	ɽ						ɢ̆		ʡ̆		
Trill	ʙ̥	ʙ							r̥	r		r̠	ɽ̊r̥	ɽr					ʀ̥	ʀ	ʜ	ʢ		
Lateral affricate									tɬ	dɮ			tꞎ	d𝼅	c𝼆	ɟʎ̝	k𝼄	ɡʟ̝						
Lateral fricative							ɬ̪		ɬ	ɮ			ꞎ	𝼅	𝼆	ʎ̝	𝼄	ʟ̝						
Lateral approximant								l̪	l̥	l		l̠	ɭ̊	ɭ	ʎ̥	ʎ	ʟ̥	ʟ		ʟ̠				
Lateral tap/flap									ɺ̥	ɺ			𝼈̊	𝼈		ʎ̆		ʟ̆						

		BL	LD	D	A	PA	RF	P	V	U
Implosive	Voiced	ɓ			ɗ		ᶑ	ʄ	ɠ	ʛ
Implosive	Voiceless	ɓ̥			ɗ̥		ᶑ̊	ʄ̊	ɠ̊	ʛ̥
Ejective	Stop	pʼ			tʼ		ʈʼ	cʼ	kʼ	qʼ
Ejective	Affricate		p̪fʼ	tθʼ	tsʼ	tʃʼ	tʂʼ	tɕʼ	kxʼ	qχʼ
Ejective	Fricative	ɸʼ	fʼ	θʼ	sʼ	ʃʼ	ʂʼ	ɕʼ	xʼ	χʼ
Ejective	Lateral affricate				tɬʼ			c𝼆ʼ	k𝼄ʼ	q𝼄ʼ
Ejective	Lateral fricative				ɬʼ					
Click (top: velar; bottom: uvular)	Tenuis	kʘ qʘ		kǀ qǀ	kǃ qǃ		k𝼊 q𝼊	kǂ qǂ		
Click (top: velar; bottom: uvular)	Voiced	ɡʘ ɢʘ		ɡǀ ɢǀ	ɡǃ ɢǃ		ɡ𝼊 ɢ𝼊	ɡǂ ɢǂ		
Click (top: velar; bottom: uvular)	Nasal	ŋʘ ɴʘ		ŋǀ ɴǀ	ŋǃ ɴǃ		ŋ𝼊 ɴ𝼊	ŋǂ ɴǂ	ʞ	
Click (top: velar; bottom: uvular)	Tenuis lateral				kǁ qǁ					
Click (top: velar; bottom: uvular)	Voiced lateral				ɡǁ ɢǁ					
Click (top: velar; bottom: uvular)	Nasal lateral				ŋǁ ɴǁ					
