= Close front unrounded vowel =

Vowel sound represented by ⟨i⟩ in IPA

i
- IPA number: 301

Audio sample
- source · help

Encoding
- Entity (decimal): &#105;
- Unicode (hex): U+0069
- X-SAMPA: i
- Braille: ⠊ (braille pattern dots-24)
Image

IPA: Vowels

| | Front | Central | Back |
|---|---|---|---|
| Close | i y | ɨ ʉ | ɯ u |
| Near-close | ɪ ʏ | | ʊ |
| Close-mid | e ø | ɘ ɵ | ɤ o |
| Mid | e̞ ø̞ | ə | ɤ̞ o̞ |
| Open-mid | ɛ œ | ɜ ɞ | ʌ ɔ |
| Near-open | æ | ɐ |
| Open | a ɶ | ä | ɑ ɒ |

- IPA help
- audio
- full chart
- template

Legend: unrounded • rounded

The close front unrounded vowel, or high front unrounded vowel, is a type of vowel sound that occurs in most spoken languages, represented in the International Phonetic Alphabet by the symbol ⟨i⟩. It is similar to the vowel sound in the English word meet—and often called long-e in American English. Although in English this sound has additional length (usually being represented as /iː/) and is not normally pronounced as a pure vowel (it is a slight diphthong), some dialects have been reported to pronounce the phoneme as a pure sound. A pure [i] sound is also heard in many other languages, such as French, in words like chic.

The close front unrounded vowel is the vocalic equivalent of the palatal approximant [j]. They alternate with each other in certain languages, such as French, and in the diphthongs of some languages, [i̯] with the non-syllabic diacritic and [j] are used in different transcription systems to represent the same sound.

Languages that use the Latin script commonly use the letter ⟨i⟩ to represent this sound, though there are some exceptions: in English orthography that letter is usually associated with /ɪ/ (as in bit) or /aɪ/ (as in bite), and /iː/ is more commonly represented by ⟨e⟩, ⟨ea⟩, ⟨ee⟩, ⟨ie⟩ or ⟨ei⟩, as in the words scene, bean, meet, niece, conceive; (see Great Vowel Shift). Irish orthography reflects both etymology and whether preceding consonants are broad or slender, so such combinations as ⟨aí⟩, ⟨ei⟩, and ⟨aío⟩ all represent /iː/.

== Features ==
- Its vowel height is close, also known as high, which means the tongue is positioned close to the roof of the mouth without creating a constriction that would be classified as a consonant.
- Its vowel backness is front, which means the tongue is positioned forward in the mouth without creating a constriction that would be classified as a consonant.
- Its place of articulation is palatal, which means it is articulated with the middle or back part of the tongue raised to the hard palate.
- It is unrounded, which means that the lips are not rounded.
Sagittal section of a vocal tract pronouncing the IPA sound ⟨i⟩. Note that a wavy glottis in this diagram indicates a voiced sound.

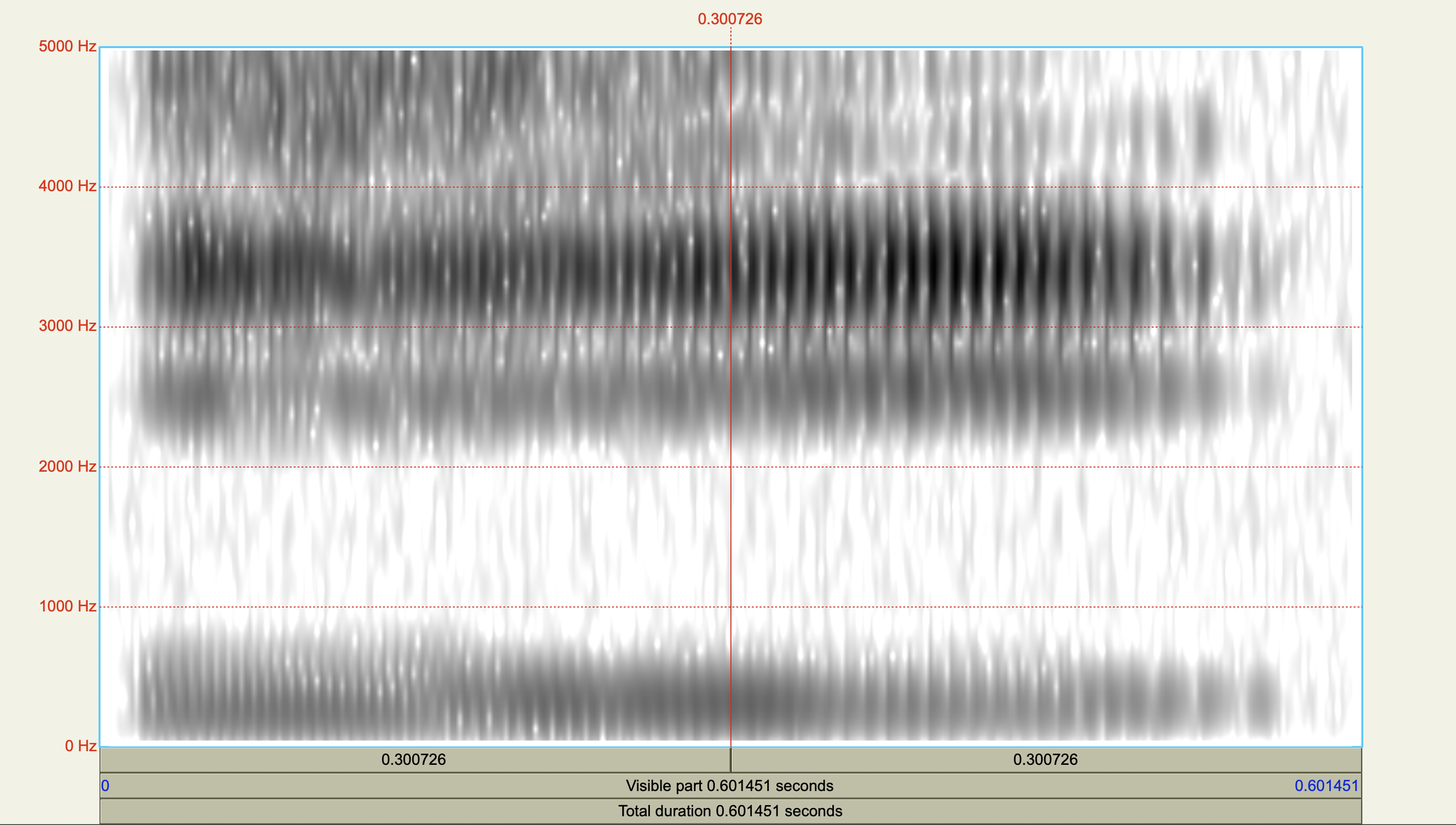
Spectrogram of [i]

== Occurrence ==
| Language | | Word | IPA | Meaning | Notes |
|---|---|---|---|---|---|
| Afrikaans | | dief | [dif] | 'thief' | See Afrikaans phonology |
| Arabic | Standard | دين / diin | [diːn] | 'religion' | See Arabic phonology |
| Bengali | | দিন | [d̪in] | 'day' | See Bengali phonology |
| Catalan | | sic | [ˈs̺ik] | 'sic' | See Catalan phonology |
| Chinese | Mandarin | 七 / qī | [tɕʰi˥] | 'seven' | See Standard Chinese phonology |
| Chuvash | | ҫип | [ɕ̬ip] | 'thread' | |
| Czech | | bílý | [ˈbiːliː] | 'white' | See Czech phonology |
| Dutch | | biet | [bit] | 'beet' | See Dutch phonology |
| English | Most dialects | free | [fɹ̠iː] | 'free' | Depending on dialect, can be pronounced as [ɪi]. See English phonology |
| English | Australian | bit | [bit] | 'bit' | Also described as near-close front [ɪ̟]. See Australian English phonology |
| French | | fini | [fini] | 'finished' | See French phonology |
| German | | Ziel | [t͡siːl] | 'goal' | See Standard German phonology |
| Greek | Modern Standard | κήπος / kípos | [ˈc̠i.po̞s̠] | 'garden' | See Modern Greek phonology |
| Hebrew | Modern Standard | חשיבה | [χäʃivä] | 'thinking' | See Modern Hebrew phonology |
| Hindustani | Hindi | ज़िंदगी(zindagi) | [zɪn̪d̪əɡiː] | 'life' | See Hindustani phonology. |
| Hindustani | Urdu | زندگی(zindagi) | [zɪn̪d̪əɡiː] | 'life' | See Hindustani phonology. |
| Hungarian | | ív | [iːv] | 'arch' | See Hungarian phonology |
| Italian | | bile | [ˈbiːle̞] | 'bile' | See Italian phonology |
| Japanese | | 銀 / gin | [ɡʲiɴ] | 'silver' | See Japanese phonology |
| Khmer | | លទ្ធិ / lôtthĭ | [lattʰiʔ] | 'doctrine' | See Khmer phonology |
| Korean | | 아이 / ai | [ɐi] | 'child' | See Korean phonology |
| Kurdish | Kurmanji (Northern) | şîr | [ʃiːɾ] | 'milk' | See Kurdish phonology |
| Kurdish | Sorani (Central) | شیر / kuşîr | [ʃiːɾ] | 'milk' | See Kurdish phonology |
| Kurdish | Palewani (Southern) | شیر / kuşîr | [ʃiːɾ] | 'milk' | See Kurdish phonology |
| Lithuanian | | vyras | [viːrɐs̪] | 'man' | See Lithuanian orthography |
| Malay | Malaysian Malay | ikut | [i.kʊt] | 'to follow' | See Malay phonology |
| Malayalam | | ഇല | [ilɐ] | 'leaf' | See Malayalam phonology |
| Mpade | | fli | [fli] | 'monkey' | |
| Polish | | miś | [ˈmʲiɕ] | 'teddy bear' | See Polish phonology |
| Portuguese | | si | [ˈsi] | 'oneself' | Also occurs as an unstressed allophone of other vowels. May be represented by ⟨y⟩. See Portuguese phonology |
| Romanian | | insulă | [ˈin̪s̪ulə] | 'island' | See Romanian phonology |
| Rungus | | rikot | [ˈri.kot] | 'to come' | |
| Russian | | лист / list | [lʲis̪t̪ʰ] | 'leaf' | Only occurs word-initially or after palatalized consonants. See Russian phonology |
| Serbo-Croatian | | виле / vile | [ʋîle̞] | 'hayfork' | See Serbo-Croatian phonology |
| Spanish | | tipo | [ˈt̪ipo̞] | 'type' | May also be represented by ⟨y⟩. See Spanish phonology |
| Sotho | | ho bitsa | [huˌbit͡sʼɑ̈] | 'to call' | Contrasts close, near-close and close-mid front unrounded vowels. See Sotho phonology |
| Swedish | Central Standard | bli | [bliː] | 'become' | Often realized as a sequence [ij] or [iʝ] (hear the word: [nɪ̝ːʝ̊]); it may also be fricated [iᶻː] or, in some regions, fricated and centralized ([ɨᶻː]). See Swedish phonology |
| Tagalog | | ibon | [ˈʔibɔn] | 'bird' | |
| Thai | | กริช / krit | [krìt] | 'dagger' | |
| Turkish | | ip | [ip] | 'rope' | See Turkish phonology |
| Ukrainian | | місто / misto | ['misto] | 'city, town' | See Ukrainian phonology |
| Welsh | | es i | [eːs iː] | 'I went' | See Welsh phonology |
| Yoruba | | síbí | [síbí] | 'spoon' | |

== Notes ==
| Place → | Labial | | | | | Coronal | | | | | | | | | | Dorsal | | | | | Laryngeal | | | |
| Manner ↓ | Bilabial | | Labiodental | | Linguolabial | | Dental | | Alveolar | | Postalveolar | | Retroflex | | (Alveolo-)palatal | | Velar | | Uvular | | Pharyngeal/epiglottal | | Glottal | |
|---|---|---|---|---|---|---|---|---|---|---|---|---|---|---|---|---|---|---|---|---|---|---|---|---|
| Nasal | m̥ | m | ɱ̊ | ɱ | | n̼ | n̪̊ | n̪ | n̥ | n | n̠̊ | n̠ | ɳ̊ | ɳ | ɲ̊ | ɲ | ŋ̊ | ŋ | ɴ̥ | ɴ | | | | |
| Plosive | p | b | p̪ | b̪ | t̼ | d̼ | t̪ | d̪ | t | d | | | ʈ | ɖ | c | ɟ | k | ɡ | q | ɢ | ʡ | | ʔ | |
| Sibilant affricate | | | | | | | t̪s̪ | d̪z̪ | ts | dz | t̠ʃ | d̠ʒ | tʂ | dʐ | tɕ | dʑ | | | | | | | | |
| Non-sibilant affricate | pɸ | bβ | p̪f | b̪v | | | t̪θ | d̪ð | tɹ̝̊ | dɹ̝ | t̠ɹ̠̊˔ | d̠ɹ̠˔ | | | cç | ɟʝ | kx | ɡɣ | qχ | ɢʁ | ʡʜ | ʡʢ | ʔh | |
| Sibilant fricative | | | | | | | s̪ | z̪ | s | z | ʃ | ʒ | ʂ | ʐ | ɕ | ʑ | | | | | | | | |
| Non-sibilant fricative | ɸ | β | f | v | θ̼ | ð̼ | θ | ð | θ̠ | ð̠ | ɹ̠̊˔ | ɹ̠˔ | ɻ̊˔ | ɻ˔ | ç | ʝ | x | ɣ | χ | ʁ | ħ | ʕ | h | ɦ |
| Approximant | | β̞ | | ʋ | | | | ð̞ | | ɹ | | ɹ̠ | | ɻ | | j | | ɰ | | | | | | ˷ |
| Tap/flap | | ⱱ̟ | | ⱱ | | | | | ɾ̥ | ɾ | | | ɽ̊ | ɽ | | | | | | ɢ̆ | | ʡ̆ | | |
| Trill | ʙ̥ | ʙ | | | | | | | r̥ | r | | r̠ | ɽ̊r̥ | ɽr | | | | | ʀ̥ | ʀ | ʜ | ʢ | | |
| Lateral affricate | | | | | | | | | tɬ | dɮ | | | tꞎ | d𝼅 | c𝼆 | ɟʎ̝ | k𝼄 | ɡʟ̝ | | | | | | |
| Lateral fricative | | | | | | | ɬ̪ | | ɬ | ɮ | | | ꞎ | 𝼅 | 𝼆 | ʎ̝ | 𝼄 | ʟ̝ | | | | | | |
| Lateral approximant | | | | | | | | l̪ | l̥ | l | | l̠ | ɭ̊ | ɭ | ʎ̥ | ʎ | ʟ̥ | ʟ | | ʟ̠ | | | | |
| Lateral tap/flap | | | | | | | | | ɺ̥ | ɺ | | | 𝼈̊ | 𝼈 | | ʎ̆ | | ʟ̆ | | | | | | |

| | | BL | LD | D | A | PA | RF | P | V | U |
|---|---|---|---|---|---|---|---|---|---|---|
| Implosive | Voiced | ɓ | | | ɗ | | ᶑ | ʄ | ɠ | ʛ |
| Implosive | Voiceless | ɓ̥ | | | ɗ̥ | | ᶑ̊ | ʄ̊ | ɠ̊ | ʛ̥ |
| Ejective | Stop | pʼ | | | tʼ | | ʈʼ | cʼ | kʼ | qʼ |
| Ejective | Affricate | | p̪fʼ | tθʼ | tsʼ | tʃʼ | tʂʼ | tɕʼ | kxʼ | qχʼ |
| Ejective | Fricative | ɸʼ | fʼ | θʼ | sʼ | ʃʼ | ʂʼ | ɕʼ | xʼ | χʼ |
| Ejective | Lateral affricate | | | | tɬʼ | | | c𝼆ʼ | k𝼄ʼ | q𝼄ʼ |
| Ejective | Lateral fricative | | | | ɬʼ | | | | | |
| Click (top: velar; bottom: uvular) | Tenuis | kʘ qʘ | | kǀ qǀ | kǃ qǃ | | k𝼊 q𝼊 | kǂ qǂ | | |
| Click (top: velar; bottom: uvular) | Voiced | ɡʘ ɢʘ | | ɡǀ ɢǀ | ɡǃ ɢǃ | | ɡ𝼊 ɢ𝼊 | ɡǂ ɢǂ | | |
| Click (top: velar; bottom: uvular) | Nasal | ŋʘ ɴʘ | | ŋǀ ɴǀ | ŋǃ ɴǃ | | ŋ𝼊 ɴ𝼊 | ŋǂ ɴǂ | ʞ | |
| Click (top: velar; bottom: uvular) | Tenuis lateral | | | | kǁ qǁ | | | | | |
| Click (top: velar; bottom: uvular) | Voiced lateral | | | | ɡǁ ɢǁ | | | | | |
| Click (top: velar; bottom: uvular) | Nasal lateral | | | | ŋǁ ɴǁ | | | | | |
