= Open front rounded vowel =

Vowel sound represented by ⟨ɶ⟩ in IPA

ɶ
- IPA number: 312

Audio sample
- source · help

Encoding
- Entity (decimal): &#630;
- Unicode (hex): U+0276
- X-SAMPA: &
- Braille: ⠔ (braille pattern dots-35) ⠪ (braille pattern dots-246)
Image

IPA: Vowels

| | Front | Central | Back |
|---|---|---|---|
| Close | i y | ɨ ʉ | ɯ u |
| Near-close | ɪ ʏ | | ʊ |
| Close-mid | e ø | ɘ ɵ | ɤ o |
| Mid | e̞ ø̞ | ə | ɤ̞ o̞ |
| Open-mid | ɛ œ | ɜ ɞ | ʌ ɔ |
| Near-open | æ | ɐ |
| Open | a ɶ | ä | ɑ ɒ |

- IPA help
- audio
- full chart
- template

Legend: unrounded • rounded

The open front rounded vowel, or low front rounded vowel, is a type of vowel sound that has not been confirmed to be phonetic in any spoken language, but is occasionally used in phonemic transcriptions for some Germanic languages. The symbol in the International Phonetic Alphabet that represents this sound is ⟨ɶ⟩, a small capital ⟨Œ⟩. It was added to the IPA vowel chart to balance the quadrilateral by filling in the remaining gap for a rounded equivalent of [a].

While the IPA chart lists this vowel as the rounded equivalent of [a], studies of formant acoustics suggest it is closer to the rounded homologue of [æ].

A phoneme transcribed with ⟨ɶ⟩ is reported for the Amstetten dialect of Bavarian; however, it is phonetically open-mid [œ], pairing with unrounded phonemic /æ/ (phonetic [ɛ]). Similarly, certain studies of Danish and Swedish use ⟨ɶ⟩ to transcribe a phoneme that is phonetically open-mid [œ] or near-open [œ̞] (depending on the analysis), where phonemic /œ/ is phonetically raised closer to mid [œ̝]. In Maastrichtian Limburgish, the vowel transcribed with ⟨ɶː⟩ in the Mestreechter Taol dictionary is phonetically centralized, with a height between open-mid [œ̈ː] and near-open [œ̞̈ː]; phonologically, it is the long counterpart of /œ/.

Some phoneticians, such as Geoffrey K. Pullum, have argued that the co-occurrence of a fully open articulation with rounded lips is a phonetic impossibility. Following the 1989 Kiel Convention, Pullum wrote the following semi-jocular remark:

The [ɶ] symbol for Cardinal 12 survived – the unusable in pursuit of the unspeakable, as Oscar Wilde might have said, since Cardinal 12 is an unpronounceable contradiction in terms with jaws fully open and lips rounded. Perhaps one day it can be acoustically synthesized so we can hear it uttered as nature never intended.

== Features ==
- Its vowel height is open, also known as low, which means the tongue is positioned far from the roof of the mouth – that is, low in the mouth.
- Its vowel backness is front, which means the tongue is positioned forward in the mouth without creating a constriction that would be classified as a consonant. Rounded front vowels are often centralized, which means that often they are in fact near-front.
- It is rounded, which means that the lips are rounded rather than spread or relaxed.

== Occurrence ==
Near-open front rounded vowel

œ̞

ɶ̝

No language has been reported to conclusively have a phonetically true open realization. The table below mainly provides examples of near-open realizations (thus being rounded homologues of [æ], i.e. a near-open front rounded vowel), which are phonetically raised compared to cardinal [ɶ], and also often centralized (similar to [ɞ̞], but not as central). In the case of the latter, these may be transcribed as mid-centralized [ɶ̽] (alternatively, [ɶ̝̈] or [œ̞̈]).

| Language | | Word | IPA | Meaning | Notes |
|---|---|---|---|---|---|
| Danish | Some speakers | grøn | [ˈkʁɶ̽nˀ] | 'green' | Near-open and centralized; allophone of /ø/ between [ʁ] and /v/ ([w]), and of /œ/ between [ʁ] and a nasal; though becoming [ʌ̞̈] in the latter environments. Historically also an allophone of /ø/ before /j/, but likewise has merged to [ʌ̞̈]. May instead be analyzed as open-mid [œ]. See Danish phonology |
| Limburgish | Weert dialect | bui | [bɶ̽j] | 'shower' | Near-open and centralized; allophone of /œ/ before /j/ in non-diphthong sequences. See Weert dialect phonology |
| Northern Altai | Kumandin | ӧштӱ / öštü | [ɶɕty] | 'enemy' | Described by Selyutina (2000) as an open front rounded vowel, but using the transcriptions ⟨ꜵ⟩/⟨ᴔ⟩ instead of ⟨ɶ⟩ and noting that the vowel frequently delabializes to [ɐ], suggesting that it may actually be a near-open realization. Described by later sources as open-mid [œ] instead. |
| Swedish | Stockholm | öra | [ˈɶ̝̂ːrä] | 'ear' | Near-open; realization of the phoneme /øː/ (which Pelzer & Boersma (2019) recommend transcribing instead as /œː/). Corresponds to [œ̫ː] in Linköping and Lund dialects. An acoustic study by Persson (2024) points instead to a potentially open-mid central realization [œ̈ː]. See Swedish phonology |

== See also ==
- Index of phonetics articles

== Notes ==
| Place → | Labial | | | | | Coronal | | | | | | | | | | Dorsal | | | | | Laryngeal | | | |
| Manner ↓ | Bilabial | | Labiodental | | Linguolabial | | Dental | | Alveolar | | Postalveolar | | Retroflex | | (Alveolo-)palatal | | Velar | | Uvular | | Pharyngeal/epiglottal | | Glottal | |
|---|---|---|---|---|---|---|---|---|---|---|---|---|---|---|---|---|---|---|---|---|---|---|---|---|
| Nasal | m̥ | m | ɱ̊ | ɱ | | n̼ | n̪̊ | n̪ | n̥ | n | n̠̊ | n̠ | ɳ̊ | ɳ | ɲ̊ | ɲ | ŋ̊ | ŋ | ɴ̥ | ɴ | | | | |
| Plosive | p | b | p̪ | b̪ | t̼ | d̼ | t̪ | d̪ | t | d | | | ʈ | ɖ | c | ɟ | k | ɡ | q | ɢ | ʡ | | ʔ | |
| Sibilant affricate | | | | | | | t̪s̪ | d̪z̪ | ts | dz | t̠ʃ | d̠ʒ | tʂ | dʐ | tɕ | dʑ | | | | | | | | |
| Non-sibilant affricate | pɸ | bβ | p̪f | b̪v | | | t̪θ | d̪ð | tɹ̝̊ | dɹ̝ | t̠ɹ̠̊˔ | d̠ɹ̠˔ | | | cç | ɟʝ | kx | ɡɣ | qχ | ɢʁ | ʡʜ | ʡʢ | ʔh | |
| Sibilant fricative | | | | | | | s̪ | z̪ | s | z | ʃ | ʒ | ʂ | ʐ | ɕ | ʑ | | | | | | | | |
| Non-sibilant fricative | ɸ | β | f | v | θ̼ | ð̼ | θ | ð | θ̠ | ð̠ | ɹ̠̊˔ | ɹ̠˔ | ɻ̊˔ | ɻ˔ | ç | ʝ | x | ɣ | χ | ʁ | ħ | ʕ | h | ɦ |
| Approximant | | β̞ | | ʋ | | | | ð̞ | | ɹ | | ɹ̠ | | ɻ | | j | | ɰ | | | | | | ˷ |
| Tap/flap | | ⱱ̟ | | ⱱ | | | | | ɾ̥ | ɾ | | | ɽ̊ | ɽ | | | | | | ɢ̆ | | ʡ̆ | | |
| Trill | ʙ̥ | ʙ | | | | | | | r̥ | r | | r̠ | ɽ̊r̥ | ɽr | | | | | ʀ̥ | ʀ | ʜ | ʢ | | |
| Lateral affricate | | | | | | | | | tɬ | dɮ | | | tꞎ | d𝼅 | c𝼆 | ɟʎ̝ | k𝼄 | ɡʟ̝ | | | | | | |
| Lateral fricative | | | | | | | ɬ̪ | | ɬ | ɮ | | | ꞎ | 𝼅 | 𝼆 | ʎ̝ | 𝼄 | ʟ̝ | | | | | | |
| Lateral approximant | | | | | | | | l̪ | l̥ | l | | l̠ | ɭ̊ | ɭ | ʎ̥ | ʎ | ʟ̥ | ʟ | | ʟ̠ | | | | |
| Lateral tap/flap | | | | | | | | | ɺ̥ | ɺ | | | 𝼈̊ | 𝼈 | | ʎ̆ | | ʟ̆ | | | | | | |

| | | BL | LD | D | A | PA | RF | P | V | U |
|---|---|---|---|---|---|---|---|---|---|---|
| Implosive | Voiced | ɓ | | | ɗ | | ᶑ | ʄ | ɠ | ʛ |
| Implosive | Voiceless | ɓ̥ | | | ɗ̥ | | ᶑ̊ | ʄ̊ | ɠ̊ | ʛ̥ |
| Ejective | Stop | pʼ | | | tʼ | | ʈʼ | cʼ | kʼ | qʼ |
| Ejective | Affricate | | p̪fʼ | t̪θʼ | tsʼ | t̠ʃʼ | tʂʼ | tɕʼ | kxʼ | qχʼ |
| Ejective | Fricative | ɸʼ | fʼ | θʼ | sʼ | ʃʼ | ʂʼ | ɕʼ | xʼ | χʼ |
| Ejective | Lateral affricate | | | | tɬʼ | | | c𝼆ʼ | k𝼄ʼ | q𝼄ʼ |
| Ejective | Lateral fricative | | | | ɬʼ | | | | | |
| Click (top: velar; bottom: uvular) | Tenuis | kʘ qʘ | | kǀ qǀ | kǃ qǃ | | k𝼊 q𝼊 | kǂ qǂ | | |
| Click (top: velar; bottom: uvular) | Voiced | ɡʘ ɢʘ | | ɡǀ ɢǀ | ɡǃ ɢǃ | | ɡ𝼊 ɢ𝼊 | ɡǂ ɢǂ | | |
| Click (top: velar; bottom: uvular) | Nasal | ŋʘ ɴʘ | | ŋǀ ɴǀ | ŋǃ ɴǃ | | ŋ𝼊 ɴ𝼊 | ŋǂ ɴǂ | ʞ | |
| Click (top: velar; bottom: uvular) | Tenuis lateral | | | | kǁ qǁ | | | | | |
| Click (top: velar; bottom: uvular) | Voiced lateral | | | | ɡǁ ɢǁ | | | | | |
| Click (top: velar; bottom: uvular) | Nasal lateral | | | | ŋǁ ɴǁ | | | | | |
