= Trondheimsk =

Norwegian dialect of Trondheim, Norway

- Region: Trondheim
- Language family: Indo-European: Germanic; North Germanic; West Scandinavian; Trøndersk; Trondheimsk

Language codes
- ISO 639-3: –
- Glottolog: None

Trondheimsk (Urban East Norwegian: [ˈtrɔ̂nː(h)æɪmsk]), Trondheim dialect or Trondheim Norwegian is a dialect of Norwegian used in Trondheim. It is a variety of Trøndersk.

== Phonology ==
=== Consonants ===
- /l/ is dental [l̪].
  - After short vowels, it is realized as an approximant, either palatal [ʎ] or palatalized dental [l̪ʲ].
  - When it occurs after a short vowel before a voiceless stop (particularly /t/), it is realized as a voiceless dental lateral continuant, described variously as an approximant [l̪̊] and a fricative [ɬ̪].
- /r/ tends to be realized as a voiced retroflex fricative [ʐ]. It is devoiced to [ʂ] before /p/ and /k/.

=== Vowels ===
- /iː/ and /yː/ can be diphthongized to, respectively, [ie] and [ye].
- /uː/ is diphthongized to [ue].
- /eː, øː/ and /ɔː/ are diphthongized to, respectively, [eæ], [øæ] and [ɔ̝æ].
- The schwa [ə] does not exist in the Trondheim dialect.
- /æ, æː/ have the most open realization in all of Norway, i.e. open front [a, aː].
- /ɑ, ɑː/ are fully back [ɑ, ɑː].
- /ɑi/ has a back starting point [ɑi].

=== Tonemes ===
==== Phonetic realization ====
The tonemes of the Trondheim dialect are the same as those of the Oslo dialect; accent 1 is low-rising, whereas accent 2 is falling-rising.

== Bibliography ==
- Kristoffersen, Gjert (2000), The Phonology of Norwegian, Oxford University Press, ISBN 978-0-19-823765-5
- Ophaug, Wencke (2014), EXFAC Fonetikk og fonologi (PDF)
- Vanvik, Arne (1979), Norsk fonetikk, Oslo: Universitetet i Oslo, ISBN 82-990584-0-6
