= Central vowel =

Type of vowel sound

IPA: Vowels

	Front	Central	Back
Close	i y	ɨ ʉ	ɯ u
Near-close	ɪ ʏ		ʊ
Close-mid	e ø	ɘ ɵ	ɤ o
Mid	e̞ ø̞	ə	ɤ̞ o̞
Open-mid	ɛ œ	ɜ ɞ	ʌ ɔ
Near-open	æ	ɐ
Open	a ɶ	ä	ɑ ɒ

- IPA help
- audio
- full chart
- template

Legend: unrounded • rounded

A central vowel (also called a mixed vowel in some older descriptions) is a vowel articulated with the tongue in a position intermediate between that of a front vowel and a back vowel.

The term central refers to an intermediate value on the backness dimension and is not synonymous with mid, which refers to an intermediate value on the height dimension.

In the PHOIBLE 2.0 database (3,020 phoneme inventories), the most frequently reported central-vowel phonemes with dedicated IPA letters are [ə] and [ɨ], occurring in 675 (22%) and 491 (16%) inventories respectively. Other dedicated central-vowel letters such as [ʉ], [ɵ], [ɜ], and [ɞ] are much less common.

== Articulation and acoustics ==
Central vowels are defined primarily by tongue-body position (and often jaw position). Because the vowel space is continuous rather than divided into sharp boundaries, vowels described as central may vary in their precise articulation across languages and transcription traditions.

The IPA vowel chart (and related "vowel quadrilateral" diagrams) is a conventional schematic representation of vowel qualities. The horizontal axis corresponds to front–central–back tongue position, and the vertical axis corresponds to close–open (high–low) tongue height, with rounding typically represented by paired symbols.

In acoustic terms, perceived vowel height and backness correlate (roughly) with the first two vowel formants: higher vowels tend to have lower F1, and more back (and/or more rounded) vowels tend to have lower F2. Central vowels often have intermediate F2 values compared with front and back vowels of similar height.

== IPA transcription ==
Centralized

◌̈
- IPA number: 415

Encoding
- Entity (decimal): &#776;
- Unicode (hex): U+0308

On the International Phonetic Alphabet vowel chart, central vowels occupy the middle column between front and back vowels. When finer distinctions are needed, central vowel qualities are often transcribed using diacritics such as centralized (⟨◌̈⟩) and mid-centralized (⟨◌̽⟩), along with diacritics for small height/backness adjustments (e.g. raised ⟨◌̝⟩, lowered ⟨◌̞⟩, advanced ⟨◌̟⟩, retracted ⟨◌̠⟩).

=== Central vowels with dedicated IPA letters ===
The central vowels that have dedicated letters in the IPA include:

- close central unrounded vowel [ɨ]
- close central rounded vowel [ʉ]
- close-mid central unrounded vowel [ɘ] (also transcribed ⟨ë⟩ using the IPA centralized diacritic; sometimes typed as ⟨ë⟩)
- close-mid central rounded vowel [ɵ] (also transcribed ⟨ö⟩ using the IPA centralized diacritic; sometimes typed as ⟨ö⟩)
- mid central vowel [ə]
- open-mid central unrounded vowel [ɜ] (also transcribed ⟨ɛ̈⟩ using the IPA centralized diacritic)
- open-mid central rounded vowel [ɞ] (also transcribed ⟨ɔ̈⟩ using the IPA centralized diacritic)
- near-open central vowel [ɐ] (typically used for an unrounded vowel; if precision is desired, ⟨ɜ̞⟩ may be used for an unrounded vowel and ⟨ɞ̞⟩ for a rounded vowel)

In some transcription traditions (for example, in Australian and British phonetics), ⟨ɜ⟩ is often used for a stressed "full" central vowel and ⟨ə⟩ for an unstressed reduced vowel ("schwa"), while other traditions (including many American sources) may use ⟨ə⟩ for a fully realized central vowel as well.

=== Central vowels without dedicated IPA letters ===
Central vowel qualities that lack dedicated IPA letters are typically written with diacritics indicating centralization or small shifts in vowel height/backness.

Common examples include:

- near-close central unrounded vowel [ɨ̞], [ɪ̈], [ɪ̠] or [ɘ̝]
- near-close central rounded vowel [ʉ̞], [ʊ̈], [ʊ̟] or [ɵ̝]
- near-close central vowel with compressed rounding (as in some descriptions of Swedish vowels) is sometimes transcribed with a centralized diacritic on a front rounded symbol, e.g. [ʏ̈] in narrow transcription (with the rounding type described separately if needed).
- mid central unrounded vowel [ɘ̞] or [ɜ̝] (often written ⟨ə⟩ in broader transcription)
- mid central rounded vowel [ɵ̞] or [ɞ̝] (often written ⟨ɵ⟩ in broader transcription)
- open central unrounded vowel [ä] (sometimes typed as ⟨ä⟩; because symbol usage for low vowels varies across traditions, diacritics may be added for precision)
- open central rounded vowel [ɒ̈]

== See also ==
- Front vowel
- Back vowel
- Centralization (phonetics)
- Relative articulation
- List of phonetics topics

Place →	Labial					Coronal										Dorsal					Laryngeal			
Manner ↓	Bilabial		Labiodental		Linguolabial		Dental		Alveolar		Postalveolar		Retroflex		(Alveolo-)palatal		Velar		Uvular		Pharyngeal/epiglottal		Glottal	
Nasal	m̥	m	ɱ̊	ɱ		n̼	n̪̊	n̪	n̥	n	n̠̊	n̠	ɳ̊	ɳ	ɲ̊	ɲ	ŋ̊	ŋ	ɴ̥	ɴ				
Plosive	p	b	p̪	b̪	t̼	d̼	t̪	d̪	t	d			ʈ	ɖ	c	ɟ	k	ɡ	q	ɢ	ʡ		ʔ	
Sibilant affricate							t̪s̪	d̪z̪	ts	dz	t̠ʃ	d̠ʒ	tʂ	dʐ	tɕ	dʑ								
Non-sibilant affricate	pɸ	bβ	p̪f	b̪v			t̪θ	d̪ð	tɹ̝̊	dɹ̝	t̠ɹ̠̊˔	d̠ɹ̠˔			cç	ɟʝ	kx	ɡɣ	qχ	ɢʁ	ʡʜ	ʡʢ	ʔh	
Sibilant fricative							s̪	z̪	s	z	ʃ	ʒ	ʂ	ʐ	ɕ	ʑ								
Non-sibilant fricative	ɸ	β	f	v	θ̼	ð̼	θ	ð	θ̠	ð̠	ɹ̠̊˔	ɹ̠˔	ɻ̊˔	ɻ˔	ç	ʝ	x	ɣ	χ	ʁ	ħ	ʕ	h	ɦ
Approximant		β̞		ʋ				ð̞		ɹ		ɹ̠		ɻ		j		ɰ						˷
Tap/flap		ⱱ̟		ⱱ					ɾ̥	ɾ			ɽ̊	ɽ						ɢ̆		ʡ̮		
Trill	ʙ̥	ʙ							r̥	r		r̠	ɽ̊r̥	ɽr					ʀ̥	ʀ	ʜ	ʢ		
Lateral affricate									tɬ	dɮ			tꞎ	d𝼅	c𝼆	ɟʎ̝	k𝼄	ɡʟ̝						
Lateral fricative							ɬ̪		ɬ	ɮ			ꞎ	𝼅	𝼆	ʎ̝	𝼄	ʟ̝						
Lateral approximant								l̪	l̥	l		l̠	ɭ̊	ɭ	ʎ̥	ʎ	ʟ̥	ʟ		ʟ̠				
Lateral tap/flap									ɺ̥	ɺ			𝼈̊	𝼈		ʎ̮		ʟ̆						

		BL	LD	D	A	PA	RF	P	V	U
Implosive	Voiced	ɓ			ɗ		ᶑ	ʄ	ɠ	ʛ
Implosive	Voiceless	ɓ̥			ɗ̥		ᶑ̊	ʄ̊	ɠ̊	ʛ̥
Ejective	Stop	pʼ			tʼ		ʈʼ	cʼ	kʼ	qʼ
Ejective	Affricate		p̪fʼ	t̪θʼ	tsʼ	t̠ʃʼ	tʂʼ	tɕʼ	kxʼ	qχʼ
Ejective	Fricative	ɸʼ	fʼ	θʼ	sʼ	ʃʼ	ʂʼ	ɕʼ	xʼ	χʼ
Ejective	Lateral affricate				tɬʼ			c𝼆ʼ	k𝼄ʼ	q𝼄ʼ
Ejective	Lateral fricative				ɬʼ					
Click (top: velar; bottom: uvular)	Tenuis	kʘ qʘ		kǀ qǀ	kǃ qǃ		k𝼊 q𝼊	kǂ qǂ		
Click (top: velar; bottom: uvular)	Voiced	ɡʘ ɢʘ		ɡǀ ɢǀ	ɡǃ ɢǃ		ɡ𝼊 ɢ𝼊	ɡǂ ɢǂ		
Click (top: velar; bottom: uvular)	Nasal	ŋʘ ɴʘ		ŋǀ ɴǀ	ŋǃ ɴǃ		ŋ𝼊 ɴ𝼊	ŋǂ ɴǂ	ʞ	
Click (top: velar; bottom: uvular)	Tenuis lateral				kǁ qǁ					
Click (top: velar; bottom: uvular)	Voiced lateral				ɡǁ ɢǁ					
Click (top: velar; bottom: uvular)	Nasal lateral				ŋǁ ɴǁ					
