= Dorso-ventral =

Dorso-ventral may refer to:

- Anatomical term of location
- Dorsal consonant in linguistics
