= Hard and soft G in Dutch =

Major isogloss

The pronunciation of "gezellig" with a soft G (top) and hard G (bottom)

In the Dutch language, hard and soft G (Dutch: harde en zachte G) refers to a phonetic phenomenon of the pronunciation of the letters ⟨g⟩ and ⟨ch⟩ and also a major isogloss within that language.

In southern dialects of Dutch (that is, those spoken roughly below the rivers Rhine, Meuse and Waal), the distinction between the phonemes /x/ and /ɣ/ is usual, with both realized as cardinal velars [x, ɣ] or post-palatal [ç˗, ʝ˗], hereafter represented without the diacritics. The allophony between those two types of fricatives is termed soft G in Dutch dialectology.

In northern dialects of Dutch, the distinction (if present at all) is not consistent and is best described as a fortis–lenis contrast, rather than a contrast of voicing. In those varieties, /x/ and /ɣ/ are no more front than cardinal velars, with /x/ usually being uvular: [χ] or strong velar: [x̠]. /ɣ/, if distinct from /x/, is typically a voiceless velar fricative [x]. This is termed hard G in Dutch dialectology. It is also used in Afrikaans, so that the Afrikaans word goed 'good' has the same pronunciation as in Northern Dutch ([χut]), in addition to having the same meaning in both languages.

== Pronunciation ==
=== Southern ===
In Southern Dutch, the phonemes /x/ and /ɣ/ are either cardinal velars [x, ɣ] or post-palatal [ç̠, ʝ̠]. More specifically, post-palatals occur in contact with phonemic front vowels and /ə/, whereas the cardinal velars occur in contact with phonemic back vowels (including /aː/ and /ɑ/). The phonemes usually contrast by voicing, but /ɣ/ can be devoiced to a lenis [ɣ̊ ~ ʝ̊] that differs from /x/ in a less energetic articulation. Verhoeven and Hageman even found that 70% of word-initial and 56% of intervocalic lenis fricatives (which includes /v/ and /z/) are realized as fully voiceless in Belgium. In Maastrichtian Limburgish, initial /ɣ/ is often partially devoiced as well.

In many cases, [j] still patterns as an obstruent, an allophone of /ɣ/ in Ripuarian. The plural form zeëje [ˈzeəjə] 'saws' has an underlying /ɣ/: /ˈzeəɣə/ because it alternates with a voiceless fricative in the root zeëg [ˈzeəç] 'saw', phonemically /ˈzeəɣ/. Compare this with the alternation in vroag [ˈvʁoəχ] 'question' - vroage [ˈvʁoəʁə] 'questions' (phonemically /ˈvroəɣ/, /ˈvroəɣə/) or with the plural-singular pair löcher [ˈlœçəʁ] - laoch [ˈlɔːχ], which has underlying voiceless fricatives: /ˈlœxər/, /ˈlɔːx/. The /j/ phoneme is a sonorant and thus cannot participate in alternations like the first two. Furthermore, Ripuarian features a different pronunciation of /x/ and /ɣ/ after back vowels, as uvular [χ, ʁ], not dissimilar from the Northern Dutch pronunciation in the first case. The realization of /ɣ/ as [ʁ] results in a phonetic merger with /r/ and is thus an example of rhotacism. The consonants surrounding the diphthong in vroage /ˈvroəɣə/ are indistinguishable from each other: [ˈvʁoəʁə]). This is a typical feature of Ripuarian. This merger is also not phonemic as /r/ too is a sonorant and thus cannot participate in alternations such as [ˈvʁoəχ] - [ˈvʁoəʁə] mentioned above.

=== Northern ===
In Northern Dutch, /ɣ/ appears immediately before voiced consonants and sometimes also between vowels, but not in the word-initial position. In the latter case, the sound is not voiced and differs from /x/ in length (/ɣ/ is longer) and in that it is produced a little bit further front (mediovelar, rather than postvelar) and lacks any trilling, so that vlaggen /ˈvlɑɣən/ 'flags' has a somewhat lengthened, plain voiceless velar [xˑ] (hereafter represented with ⟨ɣ̊⟩): [ˈvlɑ.ɣ̊ə(n)], whereas lachen /ˈlɑxən/ 'to laugh' features a shorter, post-velar fricative with a simultaneous voiceless uvular trill, transcribed with ⟨x̠͡ʀ̥⟩ or ⟨ʀ̝̊˖⟩ in narrow IPA but normally written with ⟨χ⟩ or ⟨x⟩. In this article, ⟨χ⟩ is used ([ˈlɑ.χə(n)]), even though the fricative portion is usually more front than cardinal uvulars. In Northern Dutch, the contrast between /x/ and /ɣ/ is unstable, and vlaggen is more likely to feature [χ]: [ˈvlɑχə(n)]. Apart from Ripuarian, the voiceless trill fricative [ʀ̝̊] appears in very different contexts in Southern Dutch, being an allophone of /r/.

== See also ==
- Dutch phonology
- Afrikaans phonology

== Bibliography ==
- Bowerman, Sean (2004). "White South African English: phonology". In Schneider, Edgar W.; Burridge, Kate; Kortmann, Bernd; Mesthrie, Rajend; Upton, Clive (eds.). A handbook of varieties of English. Vol. 1: Phonology. Mouton de Gruyter. pp. 931–942. ISBN 978-3-11-017532-5.
- Collins, Beverley; Mees, Inger M. (1982). "A phonetic description of the consonant system of Standard Dutch (ABN)". Journal of the International Phonetic Association. 12 (1): 2–12. doi:10.1017/S0025100300002358. JSTOR 44526677. S2CID 144910869.
- Collins, Beverley; Mees, Inger M. (2003) [First published 1981]. The Phonetics of English and Dutch (5th ed.). Leiden: Brill Publishers. ISBN 9004103406.
- Goeman, Ton; Van de Velde, Hans (2001). "Co-occurrence constraints on /r/ and /ɣ/ in Dutch dialects". In van de Velde, Hans; van Hout, Roeland (eds.). 'r-atics. Brussels: Etudes & Travaux. pp. 91–112. ISSN 0777-3692.
- Gussenhoven, Carlos (1999). "Dutch". Handbook of the International Phonetic Association: A guide to the use of the International Phonetic Alphabet. Cambridge: Cambridge University Press. pp. 74–77. ISBN 0-521-65236-7.
- Gussenhoven, Carlos; Aarts, Flor (1999). "The dialect of Maastricht" (PDF). Journal of the International Phonetic Association. 29 (2). University of Nijmegen, Centre for Language Studies: 155–166. doi:10.1017/S0025100300006526. S2CID 145782045. Archived from the original (PDF) on 2017-10-11.
- Heijmans, Linda; Gussenhoven, Carlos (1998). "The Dutch dialect of Weert" (PDF). Journal of the International Phonetic Association. 28 (1–2): 107–112. doi:10.1017/S0025100300006307. S2CID 145635698. Archived from the original (PDF) on 2016-03-04.
- Peters, Jörg (2010). "The Flemish–Brabant dialect of Orsmaal–Gussenhoven". Journal of the International Phonetic Association. 40 (2): 239–246. doi:10.1017/S0025100310000083.
- Russ, Charles V.J. (1989). The dialects of Modern German: A Linguistic survey. Routledge. ISBN 978-0-415-00308-7.
- Stichting Kirchröadsjer Dieksiejoneer (1997) [1987]. Kirchröadsjer Dieksiejoneer (in Dutch) (2nd ed.). Kerkrade: Stichting Kirchröadsjer Dieksiejoneer. ISBN 90-70246-34-1.
- Tops, Evie (2009). Variatie en verandering van de /r/ in Vlaanderen. Brussels: VUBPress. ISBN 9789054874713.
- Verhoeven, Jo (2005). "Belgian Standard Dutch" (PDF). Journal of the International Phonetic Association. 35 (2): 243–247. doi:10.1017/S0025100305002173. S2CID 146567016.
