= Afrikaans phonology =

System of sounds for the Afrikaans language

Afrikaans has a similar phonology to other West Germanic languages, especially Dutch.

== Vowels ==
Monophthongs of Afrikaans on a vowel chart.

Afrikaans has an extensive vowel inventory consisting of 17 vowel phonemes, including 10 monophthongs and 7 diphthongs. There are also 7 marginal monophthongs.

=== Monophthongs ===
Monophthong phonemes
	Front			Central				Back	
	unrounded		rounded	unrounded		rounded		Back	
	short	long	short	short	long	short	long	short	long
Close	i	(iː)	y(ː)					u	(uː)
Mid	ɛ	(ɛː)		ə	(əː)	œ	(œː)	ɔ	(ɔː)
Near-open	(æ)	(æː)							
Open	a								ɑː

==== The phonetic quality of the close vowels ====
- /y/ tends to be merged with /i/ into [i].
- /u/ is weakly rounded and could be more narrowly transcribed as [u̜] or [ɯ̹]. Thus, it is sometimes transcribed /ɯ/.

==== The phonetic quality of the mid vowels ====
- /ɛ, ɛː, ɔ, ɔː/ vary between mid [ɛ̝, ɛ̝ː, ɔ̝, ɔ̝ː] or close-mid [e, eː, o, oː].
- According to some scholars, the stressed allophone of /ə/ is actually closer than mid ([ɘ]). However, other scholars do not distinguish between stressed and unstressed schwas. This article uses the symbol [ə] regardless of the exact height of the vowel.
- The central /ə, əː/, not the front /ɛ, ɛː/, are the unrounded counterparts of /œ, œː/. Phonetically, /ə, əː, œ, œː/ have been variously described as mid [ə, əː, ɞ̝, ɞ̝ː] and open-mid [ɜ, ɜː, ɞ, ɞː].
- /œ, œː/ are rather weakly rounded, and many speakers merge /œ/ with /ə/ into [ə], even in formal speech. The merger has been noted in colloquial speech since the 1920s.

==== The phonetic quality of the open vowels ====
- In some words such as vanaand /faˈnɑːnt/ 'this evening; tonight', unstressed ⟨a⟩ is actually a schwa [ə], not [a].
- /a/ is open near-front [a̠], but older sources describe it as near-open central [ɐ] and open central [ä].
- /ɑː/ is either open near-back [ɑ̟ː] or open back [ɑː]. Especially in stressed positions, the back realization may be rounded [ɒː], and sometimes it may be even as high as the /ɔː/ phoneme. The rounded realization is associated with younger white speakers, especially female speakers of northern accents.

==== Other notes ====
- As phonemes, /iː/ and /uː/ occur only in the words spieël /spiːl/ 'mirror' and koeël /kuːl/ 'bullet', which used to be pronounced with sequences /i.ə/ and /u.ə/ respectively. In other cases, [iː] and [uː] occur as allophones of /i/ and /u/ respectively before /r/.
- Close vowels are phonetically long before /r/.
- /ɛ/ contrasts with /ɛː/ only in the minimal pair pers /pɛrs/ 'press' – pêrs /pɛːrs/ 'purple'.
- Before the sequences /rt, rd, rs/, the /ɛ–ɛː/ and /ɔ–ɔː/ contrasts are neutralized in favour of the long variants /ɛː/ and /ɔː/, respectively.
- /əː/ occurs only in the word wîe 'wedges', which is realized as either [ˈvəːə] or [ˈvəːɦə] (with a weak [ɦ]).
- The orthographic sequence ⟨ûe⟩ is realised as either [œː.ə] or [œː.ɦə] (with a weak [ɦ]).
- /œː, ɔː/ occur only in a few words.
- As a phoneme, /æ/ occurs only in some loanwords from English, such as pêl /pæːl/ 'pal', or as a dialectal allophone of /ɛ/ before /k, χ, l, r/, most commonly in the former Transvaal and Free State provinces.
- /a/ has been variously transcribed with ⟨a⟩, ⟨ɐ⟩ and ⟨ɑ⟩. This article uses ⟨a⟩.
- /ɑː/ has been variously transcribed with ⟨ɑː⟩ and ⟨aː⟩. This article uses the former symbol.
- In some words, such as hamer, short /a/ is in free variation with long /ɑː/ despite the fact that the spelling suggests the latter. In some words, such as laat (vb. 'let'), the pronunciation with short /a/ occurs only in colloquial language, to distinguish from homophones (laat, adj. 'late'). In some other words, such as aan 'on', the pronunciation with short /a/ is already a part of the standard language. The shortening of /ɑː/ has been noted as early as 1927.
- The orthographic sequence ⟨ae⟩ can be pronounced as either [ɑː] or [ɑːɦə] (with a weak [ɦ]).

Example words for monophthongs
Short				Long			
Phoneme	IPA	Orthography	Gloss	Phoneme	IPA	Orthography	Gloss
/i/	/dif/	dief	'thief'	/iː/	/spiːl/	spieël	'mirror'
/y/	/ˈsykis/	suutjies	'quietly'				
/u/	/buk/	boek	'book'	/uː/	/kuːl/	koeël	'bullet'
/ɛ/	/bɛt/	bed	'bed'	/eː/	/seː/	sê	'say'
/ə/	/kənt/	kind	'child'	/əː/	/ˈvəːə/	wîe	'wedges'
/œ/	/kœs/	kus	'kiss'	/œː/	/rœːə/	rûe	'backs'
/ɔ/	/bɔk/	bok	'goat'	/oː/	/soːə/	sôe	'sows'
/æ/	/pæl/	pêl	'pal'	/æː/	/fæːr/	ver	'far'
/a/	/kat/	kat	'cat'	/ɑː/	/kɑːrt/	kaart	'map'

==== Nasalized vowels ====
In some instances of the postvocalic sequence /ns/, /n/ is realized as nasalisation (and lengthening, if the vowel is short) of the preceding monophthong, which is stronger in some speakers than others, but there also are speakers retaining [n] as well as the original length of the preceding vowel.

- The sequence /ans/ in words such as dans (meaning "dance") is realised as [ãːs]. In monosyllabic words, that is the norm.
- The sequence /ɑːns/ in more common words (such as Afrikaans) is realized as either [ɑ̃ːs] or [ɑːns]. In less common words (such as Italiaans, meaning Italian), [ɑːns] is the usual pronunciation.
- The sequence /ɛns/ in words such as mens (meaning "human") is realized as [ɛ̃ːs].
- The sequence /œns/ in words such as guns (meaning "favour") is realised more often as [œns] than as [œ̃ːs]. For speakers with the /œ–ə/ merger, these transcriptions are to be read as [əns] and [ə̃ːs], respectively.
- The sequence /ɔns/ in words such as spons (meaning "sponge") is realised as [ɔ̃ːs].

Collins & Mees (2003) analyze the pre-/s/ sequences /an, ɛn, ɔn/ as phonemic short vowels /ɑ̃, ɛ̃, ɔ̃/ and note that this process of nasalising the vowel and deleting the nasal occurs in many dialects of Dutch as well, such as The Hague dialect.

=== Diphthongs ===
Diphthong phonemes
Starting point		Ending point		
Starting point		Front	Central	Back
Closed	unrounded			iʊ̯
Closed	rounded	uɪ̯		
Mid	unrounded	əɪ̯	ɪə	
Mid	rounded	œɪ̯, ɔɪ̯, oːɪ̯	ʏə, ʊə	œʊ̯
Open	unrounded	aɪ̯, ɑːɪ̯		

==== /ɪø, ɪə, ʊə/ ====
- According to Lass (1987), the first elements of [ʏə, ɪə, ʊə] are close-mid, more narrowly transcribed [ë, ë, ö] or [ɪ̞, ɪ̞, ʊ̞]. According to De Villiers (1976), the onsets of [ɪə, ʊə] are near-close [ɪ, ʊ]. For simplicity, both variants will be written simply as [ɪø, ɪə, ʊə]. [ɪ, ʊ] are commonly used for centralized close-mid vowels anyway - see near-close near-front unrounded vowel and near-close near-back rounded vowel.
- Some sources prescribe monophthongal [øː, eː, oː] realizations of these; that is at least partially outdated:
  - There is not a complete agreement about the realisation of /ɪø/:
    - According to Lass (1987), it is realised as either rising [ɪ̯ø] or falling [ɪø̯], with the former being more common. The unrounded onset is a rather recent development and is not described by older sources. The monophthongal realisation [øː] is virtually nonexistent.
    - According to Donaldson (1993), it is realised as [øə]. Its onset is sometimes unrounded, which can cause it to merge with /eə/.
  - There is not a complete agreement about the realisation of /ɪə, ʊə/
    - According to Lass (1987), they may be realised in four ways:
      - Falling diphthongs. Their first element may be short [ɪə̯, ʊə̯] or somewhat lengthened [ɪˑə̯, ʊˑə̯].
      - Rising diphthongs [ɪ̯ə, ʊ̯ə]. These variants do not seem to appear word-finally. The sequence /ɦʊə/ is commonly realised as [ɦʊ̯ə] or, more often, [ʊ̤̑ə̤], with /ɦ/ realised as breathy voice on the diphthong.
      - Phonetically disyllabic sequences of two short monophthongs [ɪ.ə, ʊ.ə], which may occur in all environments.
      - Monophthongs, either short [ɪ, ʊ] or somewhat lengthened [ɪˑ, ʊˑ]. The monophthongal realisations occur in less stressed words as well as in stressed syllables in words that have more than one syllable. In the latter case, they are in free variation with all of the three diphthongal realisations. In case of /ʊə/, the monophthongal [ʊ] also appears in unstressed word-final syllables.
    - According to Donaldson (1993), they are realized as either [eə, oə] or [iə, uə].
- /ɪə/ also occurs in words spelled with ⟨eë⟩, like reël /ˈrɪəl/ 'rule'. Historically, these were pronounced with a disyllabic sequence /eː.ə/ and so reël used to be pronounced /ˈreː.əl/.
- There is not a complete agreement about the dialectal realisation of /ɪə, ʊə/ in the Boland area:
  - According to Lass (1987), they are centralized close-mid monophthongs [ɪ, ʊ], which do not merge with /i/ and /u/.
  - According to Donaldson (1993) and De Villiers, they are close monophthongs, long [iː, uː] according to Donaldson (1993), short [i, u] according to De Villiers.

==== Other diphthongs ====
- The scholar Daan Wissing argues that /əɪ̯/ is not a phonetically correct transcription and that /æɛ̯/ is more accurate. In his analysis, he found that [æɛ̯] makes for 65% of the realisations, the other 35% being monophthongal, [ə], [æ] and [ɛ].
- Most often, /œɪ̯/ has an unrounded offset. For some speakers, the onset is also unrounded. That can cause /œɪ̯/ to merge with /əɪ̯/, which is considered non-standard.
- /ɔɪ̯, aɪ̯/ occur mainly in loanwords.
- Older sources describe /œu/ as a narrow back diphthong [ou]. However, newer sources describe its onset as more front. For example, Lass (1984), states that the onset of /œu/ is central [ɵu].
  - In some words which, in English, are pronounced with /əʊ̯/, the Afrikaans equivalent tends to be pronounced with /œʊ̯/, rather than /ʊə/. That happens because Afrikaans /œʊ̯/ is more similar to the usual South African realization of English /əʊ̯/.

Example words for diphthongs
Phoneme	IPA	Orthography	Gloss
/ɪø/	/sɪøn/	seun	'son'
/əɪ̯/	/ɦəɪ̯/	hy	'he'
/ɪə/	/vɪət/	weet	'to know'
/œɪ̯/	/ɦœɪ̯s/	huis	'house'
/ɔɪ̯/	/ˈχɔɪ̯əŋ/	goiing	'burlap'
/ʊə/	/brʊət/	brood	'bread'
/œʊ̯/	/kœʊ̯t/	koud	'cold'
/aɪ̯/	/ˈbaɪ̯ə/	baie	'many'

==== Long diphthongs ====
The long diphthongs, also known as 'double vowels', are phonemically sequences of a free vowel and a non-syllabic equivalent of /i/ or /u/: /iu, ui, oːi, eu, ɑːi/. Although both /iu/ and /eu/ are typically pronounced as [iu], they are spelled differently; the former as ⟨ieu⟩, and the latter as ⟨eeu⟩.

==== 'False' diphthongs ====
In diminutives ending in /ki/ formed to monosyllabic nouns, the vowels /u, ɪə, ʊə, ɛ, ə, œ, ɔ, a, ɑː/ are realised as closing diphthongs [ui, ei, oi, ɛi, əi, œi, ɔi, ai, ɑːi]. In the same environment, the sequences /ɛn, ən, œn, ɔn, an/ are realized as [ɛiɲ, əiɲ, œiɲ, ɔiɲ, aiɲ], i.e. as closing diphthongs followed by palatal nasal.

- The suffixes ⟨-aad⟩ and ⟨-aat⟩ (phonemically /ɑːd/ and /ɑːt/, respectively) and the diminutive suffix /ki/ are realised as [ɑːki] (with a monophthong), rather than [ɑːiki].
- In practice, the diphthong [əi] is realised the same as the phonemic diphthong /əi/.
- [œi], when it has arisen from diphthongisation of [œ], differs from the phonemic diphthong /œi/ by having a slightly different onset, although the exact nature of that difference is unclear. This means that puntjie 'point' sounds somewhat different than puintjie 'rubble'.

Vowel comparison between Standard Dutch and Afrikaans
Pronunciation		Examples	
Standard Dutch	Afrikaans	Standard Dutch	Afrikaans
short a /ɑ/	/a/	kat /ˈkɑt/	kat /ˈkat/
long a /aː/	/ɑː/	kaart /ˈkaːrt/	kaart /ˈkɑːrt/
short e /ɛ/	/ɛ/	bed /ˈbɛt/	
long e /eː/	/ɪə/	weet /ˈʋeːt/	weet /ˈvɪət/
eu /øː/	/ʏə/	neus /ˈnøːs/	neus /ˈnʏəs/
short i /ɪ/	/ə/	kind /ˈkɪnt/	kind /ˈkənt/
long i, ie /i/	/i/	dief /ˈdif/	
short o /ɔ/	/ɔ/	bok /ˈbɔk/	
long o /oː/	/ʊə/	brood /ˈbroːt/	brood /ˈbrʊət/
oe /u/	/u/	boer /ˈbur/	
short u /ʏ/	/œ/	kus /ˈkʏs/	kus /ˈkœs/
long u /y/	/y/	duur /ˈdyr/	
ai /ɑɪ̯/	/aɪ̯/	ai /ˈɑɪ̯/	ai /ˈaɪ̯/
aai /aːɪ̯/	/ɑːɪ̯/	haai /ˈhaːɪ̯/	haai /ˈhɑːɪ̯/
au, auw /ɔʊ̯/ ou, ouw /ɔʊ̯/	ou /œʊ̯/	dauw /ˈdɔʊ̯/ koud, vrouw /ˈkɔʊ̯t, ˈvrɔʊ̯/	dou /ˈdœʊ̯/ koud, vrou /ˈkœʊ̯t, ˈfrœʊ̯/
ei /ɛɪ̯/ ij /ɛɪ̯/	ei /əɪ̯/ y /əɪ̯/	eiland /ˈɛɪ̯lɑnt/ hij /ˈhɛɪ̯/	eiland /ˈəɪ̯lant/ hy /ˈhəɪ̯/
eeu, eeuw /eːʊ̯/	eeu /iʊ̯/	leeuw /ˈleːʊ̯/	leeu /ˈliʊ̯/
ieu, ieuw /iʊ̯/	ieu /iʊ̯/	kieuw /ˈkiʊ̯/	kieu /ˈkiʊ̯/
oei /uɪ̯/	/uɪ̯/	groei /ˈɣruɪ̯/	groei /ˈχruɪ̯/
ooi /oːɪ̯/	/oːɪ̯/	mooi /ˈmoːɪ̯/	
ui /œʏ̯/	/œɪ̯/	huis /ˈhœʏ̯s/	huis /ˈhœɪ̯s/
uw /yʊ̯/	u /y/	schaduw /ˈsxaːdyʊ̯/	skadu /ˈskɑːdy/

== Consonants ==
Consonant phonemes
		Labial	Alveolar	Post- alveolar	Dorsal	Glottal
Nasal		m	n		ŋ	
Plosive	voiceless	p	t	t͡ʃ	k	
Plosive	voiced	b	d	(d͡ʒ)	(ɡ)	
Fricative	voiceless	f	s	ʃ	χ	
Fricative	voiced	v	(z)	(ʒ)		ɦ
Approximant		(w)	l	j		
Trill			r			

=== Obstruents ===
- All obstruents at the ends of words are devoiced so that, for instance, a final /d/ is realised as [t].
- /p, b/ are bilabial, whereas /f, v/ are labiodental.
  - According to some authors, /v/ is actually an approximant [ʋ].
- /p, t, k, tʃ/ are unaspirated.
- /k/ may be somewhat more front before front vowels; the fronted allophone of /k/ also occurs in diminutives ending in -djie and -tjie.
- /dʒ, z, ʒ/ occur only in loanwords.
- /χ/ is most often uvular, either a fricative, [χ] or a voiceless trill [ʀ̥], the latter especially in initial position before a stressed vowel. The uvular fricative is also used by many speakers of white South African English as a realisation of the marginal English phoneme /x/. In Afrikaans, velar [x] may be used in a few "hyper-posh" varieties , and it may also, rarely, occur as an allophone before front vowels in speakers with otherwise uvular [χ].
- /ɡ/ occurs mostly in loanwords, but also occurs as an allophone of /χ/ at the end of an inflected root where G is preceded by a short vowel and /r/ and succeeded by a schwa such as in berg(e) ('mountain', /bæːrχ, ˈbæ(ː)rɡə/).
- [w] occurs frequently as an allophone of /v/ after other obstruents, such as in kwaad ('angry').

Consonant comparison between Standard Dutch and Afrikaans
Pronunciation		Examples	
Standard Dutch	Afrikaans	Standard Dutch	Afrikaans
z /z/ voiced s /z/	s /s/	zuid /ˈzœʏ̯t/ analyse /aːnaːˈlizə/	suid /ˈsœɪ̯t/ analise /ɑːnɑːˈlisə/
starting v /v/	/f/	vier /ˈvir/	vier /ˈfir/
middle v /v/	w /v/	haven /ˈɦaːvən/	hawe /ˈɦɑːvə/
v (for Latin and French loanwords) /v/	v, w /v/	visueel /vizyˈeːl/ conservatief /kɔnsɛrvaːtif/	visueel /visyˈɪəl/ konserwatief /kɔnsɛrvɑːtif/
w /ʋ/	/v, w/	weet /ˈʋeːt/ kwaad /ˈkʋaːt/ wraak /ˈvraːk/	weet /ˈvɪət/ kwaad /ˈkwɑːt/ wraak /ˈvrɑːk/
ch /x/ g /ɣ/	g /χ/	acht /ˈɑxt/ gat /ˈɣɑt/	agt /ˈaχt/ gat /ˈχat/
sch /sx/	sk /sk/	school /ˈsxoːl/	skool /ˈskʊəl/
-rgen /-rɣən/	-rge /-rgə/	bergen /ˈbɛrɣə(n)/	berge /ˈbɛrgə/
-rv- /-rv/	-rw- /-rv/	sterven /ˈstɛrvə(n)/	sterwe /ˈstɛrvə/
-tie /-tsi, -si/	-sie /-si/	actie /ˈɑktsi ~ ˈɑksi/	aksie /ˈaksi/
-st /-st/	-s /-s/	best /ˈbɛst/	bes /ˈbɛs/
-cht /-xt/	-g /-χ/	lucht, echtgenoot /ˈlʏxt, ˈɛxtxənoːt/	lug, eggenoot /ˈlœχ, ˈɛχənʊət/
-ct /-kt/	-k /-k/	contact /ˈkɔntɑkt/	kontak /ˈkɔntak/
-isch /-is/	-ies /-is/	Tsjechisch /ˈtʃɛxis/	Tsjeggies /ˈtʃɛχis/

=== Sonorants ===
- /m/ is bilabial.
- /n/ merges with /m/ before labial consonants. Phonetically, this merged consonant is realized as bilabial [m] before /p, b/, and labiodental [ɱ] before /f, v/.
  - /n/ merges with /ŋ/ before dorsals (/k, χ/).
- /l/ is velarised [ɫ] in all positions, especially noticeably non-prevocalically.
- /r/ is usually an alveolar trill [r] or tap [ɾ]. In some parts of the former Cape Province, it is realised uvularly, either as a trill [ʀ] or a fricative [ʁ]. The uvular trill may also be pronounced as a tap [ʀ̆].

Afrikaans consonants with example words
Voiceless				Voiced			
Phoneme	Example			Phoneme	Example		
IPA	IPA	Orthography	Gloss	IPA	IPA	Orthography	Gloss
				/m/	/man/	man	'man'
				/n/	/noːɪ̯/	nooi	'invite'
				/ŋ/	/səŋ/	sing	'to sing'
/p/	/pɔt/	pot	'pot'	/b/	/bɛt/	bed	'bed'
/t/	/ˈtɑːfəl/	tafel	'table'	/d/	/dak/	dak	'roof'
/k/	/kat/	kat	'cat'	/ɡ/	/ˈsɔrɡə/	sorge	'cares'
/tʃ/	/ˈtʃɛχis/	Tsjeggies	'Czech'	/dʒ/	/ˈbadʒi/	budjie	'budgerigar'
/f/	/fits/	fiets	'bicycle'	/v/	/ˈvɑːtər/	water	'water'
/s/	/sɪøn/	seun	'son'	/z/	/ˈzulu/	Zoeloe	'Zulu'
/χ/	/χut/	goed	'good'				
/ʃ/	/ˈʃina/	Sjina	'China'	/ʒ/	/viʒyˈɪəl/	visueel	'visually'
				/ɦ/	/ɦœɪ̯s/	huis	'house'
				/l/	/lif/	lief	'dear'
				/j/	/ˈjɪəsœs/	Jesus	'Jesus'
				/r/	/roːɪ̯/	rooi	'red'

=== Tonogenesis ===
Some studies suggest Afrikaans is currently undergoing tonogenesis, whereby the contrast in voicing of onset plosives is turning into a contrast in the tone of the following vowel. This change is especially prevalent among younger and female speakers, and it is attributed to prolonged contacts with Khoisan and Bantu languages.

== See also ==
- Dutch phonology
- Afrikaans - Dutch Phonology Comparison Chart (Open Learning Environment)

== Bibliography ==
- Bowerman, Sean (2004). "White South African English: phonology". In Schneider, Edgar W.; Burridge, Kate; Kortmann, Bernd; Mesthrie, Rajend; Upton, Clive (eds.). A handbook of varieties of English. Vol. 1: Phonology. Mouton de Gruyter. pp. 931–942. ISBN 3-11-017532-0.
- Collins, Beverley; Mees, Inger M. (2003) [First published 1981]. The Phonetics of English and Dutch (5th ed.). Leiden: Brill Publishers. ISBN 9004103406.
- Den Besten, Hans (2012). "Speculations of [χ]-elision and intersonorantic [ʋ] in Afrikaans". In van der Wouden, Ton (ed.). Roots of Afrikaans: Selected Writings of Hans Den Besten. John Benjamins Publishing Company. pp. 79–93. ISBN 978-90-272-5267-8.
- De Villiers, Meyer (1976). Afrikaanse klankleer: fonetiek, fonologie en woordbou. Balkema.
- Donaldson, Bruce C. (1993). "1. Pronunciation". A Grammar of Afrikaans. Berlin: Mouton de Gruyter. pp. 1–35. ISBN 978-3-11-0134261.
- Lass, Roger (1984). "Vowel System Universals and Typology: Prologue to Theory". Phonology Yearbook. 1. Cambridge University Press: 75–111. doi:10.1017/S0952675700000300. JSTOR 4615383.
- Lass, Roger (1987). "Intradiphthongal Dependencies". In Anderson, John; Durand, Jacques (eds.). Explorations in Dependency Phonology. Dordrecht: Foris Publications Holland. pp. 109–131. ISBN 9067652970.
- Lass, Roger (2002). "South African English". In Mesthrie, Rajend (ed.). Language in South Africa. Cambridge University Press. ISBN 9780521791052.
- Le Roux, Thomas Hugo; de Villiers Pienaar, Pierre (1927). Afrikaanse Fonetiek (7th ed.). Cape Town: Juta. Archived from the original on 2018-05-18.
- Swanepoel, J.F. (1927). The sounds of Afrikaans. Their Dialectic Variations and the Difficulties They Present to an Englishman (PDF). Longmans, Green & Co.
- Wissing, Daan (2009) [2005]. "Die Afrikaanse diftong /E+/: 'n Eksperimentele ondersoek". Southern African Linguistics and Applied Language Studies. 23 (3). Taylor & Francis Group: 319–334. doi:10.2989/16073610509486393. S2CID 145686875.
- Wissing, Daan (2012). "Integrasie van artikulatoriese en akoestiese eienskappe van vokale: 'n beskrywingsraamwerk". LitNet Akademies (in Afrikaans). 9 (2). Stellenbosch: LitNet: 701–743. ISSN 1995-5928. Archived from the original on 15 April 2017.
- Wissing, Daan (2016). "Afrikaans phonology – segment inventory". Taalportaal. Archived from the original on 15 April 2017.
