= Voiceless uvular trill =

Consonantal sound represented by ⟨ʀ̥⟩ in IPA

ʀ̥

ʀ̊
- IPA number: 123 402A

Audio sample
- source · help

Encoding
- X-SAMPA: R\_0

A voiceless uvular trill is a type of consonantal sound, used in some spoken languages. It is less common than its voiced counterpart. The symbol in the International Phonetic Alphabet that represents this sound is ⟨ʀ̥⟩, a small capital version of the Latin letter r with a ring diacritic indicating voicelessness.

== Features ==
Features of a voiceless uvular trill:

- Its manner of articulation is trill, which means it is produced by directing air over an articulator so that it vibrates.
- Its place of articulation is uvular, which means it is articulated with the back of the tongue (the dorsum) at the uvula.
- Its phonation is voiceless, which means it is produced without vibrations of the vocal cords.
- It is an oral consonant, which means that air is not allowed to escape through the nose.
- It is a median consonant, which means it is produced by directing the airstream down the midline of the tongue, rather than to the sides.
- Its airstream mechanism is pulmonic, which means it is articulated by pushing air only with the intercostal muscles and abdominal muscles, as in most speech sounds.

== Occurrence ==
Language		Word	IPA	Meaning	Notes
Baïnounk Gubëeher	Some speakers		[ələːʀ̥]	'to go'	Word-final allophone of /ɾ/.
French	Belgian	triste	[t̪ʀ̥is̪t̪œ]	'sad'	Allophone of /ʁ/ after voiceless consonants; can be a fricative [χ] instead. See French phonology
German	Standard	treten	[ˈtʀ̥eːtn̩]	'to step'	Possible allophone of /r/ after voiceless consonants for speakers that realize /r/ as a uvular trill [ʀ]. See Standard German phonology
German	Chemnitz dialect	Rock	[ʀ̥ɔkʰ]	'skirt'	In free variation with [ʁ̞], [ʁ], [χ] and [q]. Does not occur in the coda.
Limburgish	Hasselt dialect	geer	[ɣeːʀ̥]	'odour'	Possible word-final allophone of /ʀ/; may be alveolar [r̥] instead. See Hasselt dialect phonology
Spanish	Central and Northern Peninsular	ojo	[ˈo̞ʀ̥o̞]	'eye'	This and [χ] are the primary realizations of /x/ in these dialects. See Spanish phonology
Spanish	Ponce dialect (in Puerto Rico)	perro	[ˈpe̞ʀ̥o̞]	'dog'	This and [χ] are the primary realizations of /r/ in this dialect. See Spanish phonology

== Fricative trill ==
Voiceless uvular fricative trill

ʀ̝̊

Audio sample
- source · help

Many languages claimed to have a voiceless uvular fricative may actually have a voiceless uvular fricative trill (a simultaneous [χ] and [ʀ̥]). Ladefoged & Maddieson (1996) note that there is "a complication in the case of uvular fricatives in that the shape of the vocal tract may be such that the uvula vibrates."

Although they are not normally differentiated in studies, languages in which they have been (Hebrew, Wolof, as well as the northern and central varieties of European Spanish) have been found to specifically possess the fricative trill. The fricative-trill can be transcribed as ⟨ʀ̝̊⟩ (a devoiced and raised uvular trill) in IPA. It is found as either the fortis counterpart of /ɣ/ (which itself is voiceless at least in Northern Standard Dutch: [x]) or the sole dorsal fricative in Northern SD and regional dialects and languages of the Netherlands (Dutch Low Saxon and West Frisian) spoken above the rivers Rhine, Meuse and Waal (sometimes termed the Rotterdam–Nijmegen Line). A plain fricative that is articulated slightly further front, as either medio-velar or post-palatal is typical of dialects spoken south of the rivers (mainly Brabantian and Limburgish but excluding Ripuarian and the dialect of Bergen op Zoom), including Belgian SD. In those dialects, the voiceless uvular fricative trill is one of the possible realizations of the phoneme /r/. See Hard and soft G in Dutch for more details.

The frication in the fricative trill variant sometimes occurs at the middle or the back of the soft palate (termed velar or mediovelar and post-velar, respectively), rather than the uvula itself. This is the case in Northern Standard Dutch as well as some varieties of Arabic, Limburgish and Madrid Spanish. It may thus be appropriate to call those variants voiceless (post)velar-uvular fricative trill as the trill component is always uvular (velar trills are not physically possible). The corresponding IPA symbol is ⟨ʀ̝̊˖⟩ (a devoiced, raised and advanced uvular trill, where the "advanced" diacritic applies only to the fricative portion of the sound). Thus, in cases where a dialectal variation between voiceless uvular and velar fricatives is claimed the main difference between the two may be the trilling of the uvula as frication can be velar in both cases - compare Northern Dutch acht [ɑʀ̝̊˖t] 'eight' (with a postvelar-uvular fricative trill) with Southern Dutch [ɑxt] or [ax̟t], which features a non-trilled fricative articulated at the middle or front of the soft palate.

Language		Word	IPA	Meaning	Notes
Afrikaans		goed	[ʀ̝̊ut]	'good'	Varies between a fricative and a fricative trill when word-initial. See Afrikaans phonology.
Arabic		خضراء ḵaḍrāʾ	[ʀ̝̊adˤraːʔ]	'green' (f.)	Fricative trill with velar frication. May be transcribed in IPA with ⟨x⟩. See Arabic phonology
Dutch	Standard Northern	acht	[ɑʀ̝̊˖t]	'eight'	Fricative trill with post-velar frication. May be transcribed in IPA with ⟨x⟩. See Dutch phonology and Hard and soft G in Dutch
Dutch	Belgian	brood	[bʀ̝̊oːt]	'bread'	Voiced when following a vowel. Realization of /r/ varies considerably among dialects. See Dutch phonology
English	Scouse	clock	[kl̥ɒʀ̝̊]	'clock'	Possible word-final realization of /k/; varies between a fricative and a fricative trill.
English	Scouse	neck	[nɛʀ̝̊]	'neck'	Possible word-final realization of /k/; varies between a fricative and a fricative trill.
Hebrew		מֶלֶךְ / mélekh	[ˈme̞le̞ʀ̝̊]	'king'	Usually a fricative trill. See Modern Hebrew phonology.
Limburgish	Some dialects	waor	[β̞ɒ̝ːʀ̝̊]	'was'	Allophone of /r/ that has been variously described as occurring in the syllable coda and word-final. May be only partially devoiced; frication may be uvular or post-velar. The example word is from the Maastrichtian dialect. See Maastrichtian dialect phonology and Hard and soft G in Dutch
Low German	Dutch Low Saxon	acht	[ɑʀ̝̊˖t]	'eight'	Fricative trill with post-velar frication; voiceless counterpart of /ɣ/. May be transcribed in IPA with ⟨x⟩. See Hard and soft G in Dutch
Spanish	European	ojo	[ˈo̞ʀ̝̊o̞]	'eye'	Fricative trill; frication is velar in Madrid. Occurs in northern and central varieties. Most often, it is transcribed with ⟨x⟩ in IPA. See Spanish phonology.
Upper Sorbian		brach	[bʁ̞äʀ̝̊]	'fault'	Fricative trill.
West Frisian		berch	[bɛrʀ̝̊˖]	'mountain'	Fricative trill with post-velar frication; voiceless counterpart of /ɣ/. Never occurs in word-initial positions. May be transcribed in IPA with ⟨x⟩. See West Frisian phonology
Wolof		ñax	[ɲaʀ̝̊]	'grass'	Fricative trill.

== See also ==
- Index of phonetics articles
- Uvular trill

== Notes ==
Place →	Labial					Coronal										Dorsal					Laryngeal			
Manner ↓	Bilabial		Labiodental		Linguolabial		Dental		Alveolar		Postalveolar		Retroflex		(Alveolo-)palatal		Velar		Uvular		Pharyngeal/epiglottal		Glottal	
Nasal	m̥	m	ɱ̊	ɱ		n̼	n̪̊	n̪	n̥	n	n̠̊	n̠	ɳ̊	ɳ	ɲ̊	ɲ	ŋ̊	ŋ	ɴ̥	ɴ				
Plosive	p	b	p̪	b̪	t̼	d̼	t̪	d̪	t	d			ʈ	ɖ	c	ɟ	k	ɡ	q	ɢ	ʡ		ʔ	
Sibilant affricate							t̪s̪	d̪z̪	ts	dz	t̠ʃ	d̠ʒ	tʂ	dʐ	tɕ	dʑ								
Non-sibilant affricate	pɸ	bβ	p̪f	b̪v			t̪θ	d̪ð	tɹ̝̊	dɹ̝	t̠ɹ̠̊˔	d̠ɹ̠˔			cç	ɟʝ	kx	ɡɣ	qχ	ɢʁ	ʡʜ	ʡʢ	ʔh	
Sibilant fricative							s̪	z̪	s	z	ʃ	ʒ	ʂ	ʐ	ɕ	ʑ								
Non-sibilant fricative	ɸ	β	f	v	θ̼	ð̼	θ	ð	θ̠	ð̠	ɹ̠̊˔	ɹ̠˔	ɻ̊˔	ɻ˔	ç	ʝ	x	ɣ	χ	ʁ	ħ	ʕ	h	ɦ
Approximant		β̞		ʋ				ð̞		ɹ		ɹ̠		ɻ		j		ɰ						˷
Tap/flap		ⱱ̟		ⱱ					ɾ̥	ɾ			ɽ̊	ɽ						ɢ̆		ʡ̆		
Trill	ʙ̥	ʙ							r̥	r		r̠	ɽ̊r̥	ɽr					ʀ̥	ʀ	ʜ	ʢ		
Lateral affricate									tɬ	dɮ			tꞎ	d𝼅	c𝼆	ɟʎ̝	k𝼄	ɡʟ̝						
Lateral fricative							ɬ̪		ɬ	ɮ			ꞎ	𝼅	𝼆	ʎ̝	𝼄	ʟ̝						
Lateral approximant								l̪	l̥	l		l̠	ɭ̊	ɭ	ʎ̥	ʎ	ʟ̥	ʟ		ʟ̠				
Lateral tap/flap									ɺ̥	ɺ			𝼈̊	𝼈		ʎ̆		ʟ̆						

		BL	LD	D	A	PA	RF	P	V	U
Implosive	Voiced	ɓ			ɗ		ᶑ	ʄ	ɠ	ʛ
Implosive	Voiceless	ɓ̥			ɗ̥		ᶑ̊	ʄ̊	ɠ̊	ʛ̥
Ejective	Stop	pʼ			tʼ		ʈʼ	cʼ	kʼ	qʼ
Ejective	Affricate		p̪fʼ	tθʼ	tsʼ	tʃʼ	tʂʼ	tɕʼ	kxʼ	qχʼ
Ejective	Fricative	ɸʼ	fʼ	θʼ	sʼ	ʃʼ	ʂʼ	ɕʼ	xʼ	χʼ
Ejective	Lateral affricate				tɬʼ			c𝼆ʼ	k𝼄ʼ	q𝼄ʼ
Ejective	Lateral fricative				ɬʼ					
Click (top: velar; bottom: uvular)	Tenuis	kʘ qʘ		kǀ qǀ	kǃ qǃ		k𝼊 q𝼊	kǂ qǂ		
Click (top: velar; bottom: uvular)	Voiced	ɡʘ ɢʘ		ɡǀ ɢǀ	ɡǃ ɢǃ		ɡ𝼊 ɢ𝼊	ɡǂ ɢǂ		
Click (top: velar; bottom: uvular)	Nasal	ŋʘ ɴʘ		ŋǀ ɴǀ	ŋǃ ɴǃ		ŋ𝼊 ɴ𝼊	ŋǂ ɴǂ	ʞ	
Click (top: velar; bottom: uvular)	Tenuis lateral				kǁ qǁ					
Click (top: velar; bottom: uvular)	Voiced lateral				ɡǁ ɢǁ					
Click (top: velar; bottom: uvular)	Nasal lateral				ŋǁ ɴǁ					
