= Voiced uvular tap and flap =

Consonantal sound represented by ⟨ɢ̆⟩ or ⟨ʀ̆⟩ in IPA

Voiced uvular tap or flap

ɢ̆

ʀ̆
- IPA number: 112 505

Audio sample
- source · help

Encoding
- Entity (decimal): &#610;&#774;
- Unicode (hex): U+0262 U+0306
- X-SAMPA: G\_X
Image

A voiced uvular tap or flap is a type of consonantal sound, used in some spoken languages. There is no dedicated symbol for this sound in the IPA. It can specified by adding the extra-short diacritic to the letter for the uvular plosive, ⟨ɢ̆⟩, but it is also often covered by the unmodified letter for the uvular trill, ⟨ʀ⟩, since the two have never been reported to contrast and a uvular tap or flap is not known to exist as a phoneme in any language.

In some languages a uvular tap is reported is said to vary allophonically with a uvular trill, and is most likely a single-contact trill [ʀ̆] rather than an actual tap or flap [ɢ̆] in these languages.

== Features ==
Features of a voiced uvular tap or flap:

- Its manner of articulation is tap or flap, which means it is produced with a single contraction of the muscles so that one articulator (usually the tongue) is thrown against another.
- Its place of articulation is uvular, which means it is articulated with the back of the tongue (the dorsum) at the uvula.
- Its phonation is voiced, which means the vocal cords vibrate during the articulation.
- It is an oral consonant, which means that air is not allowed to escape through the nose.
- It is a median consonant, which means it is produced by directing the airstream down the midline of the tongue, rather than to the sides.
- Its airstream mechanism is pulmonic, which means it is articulated by pushing air only with the intercostal muscles and abdominal muscles, as in most speech sounds.

== Occurrence ==
Language		Word	IPA	Meaning	Notes
Dutch		rood	[ʀ̆oːt]	'red'	More common than a uvular trill. Realization of /r/ varies considerably among dialects. See Dutch phonology
English	Northumbrian	red	[ɢ̆ɛd]	'red'	Tap, or also a tapped fricative, most usually a plain fricative. See Northumbrian burr
German	Standard	Ehre	[ˈʔeːʀ̆ə]	'honor'	Common intervocalic realization of uvular trill. See Standard German phonology
Hiu		[βɔ̞ʀ̆]		'hibiscus'	
Ibibio		ufʌkọ	[úfʌ̟̀ɢ̆ɔ̞]	'summary'	Intervocalic allophone of /k/; may be a velar approximant [ɰ] instead.
Limburgish	Hasselt dialect	weuren	[ˈβ̞øːʀ̆ən]	'(they) were'	Possible intervocalic allophone of /r/; may be alveolar [ɾ] instead. See Hasselt dialect phonology
Okanagan	Southern	ʕaləp	[ɢ̆àlə́p]	'lose'	Allophone of /ʕ/; corresponds to [ʕ] in other dialects.
Supyire		tadugugo	[taduɢ̆uɢ̆o]	'place to go up'	May be in free variation with [ɡ].
Wahgi					Allophone of /ʟ̝/.
Yiddish	Standard	בריק	[bʀ̆ɪk]	'bridge'	Less commonly a trill [ʀ]; can be alveolar [ɾ ~ r] instead. See Yiddish phonology

== Tapped fricative ==
Voiced uvular tapped fricative

ʁ̆

Language		Word	IPA	Meaning	Notes
English	Northumbrian	red	[ʁ̆ɛd]	'red'	Tap, or also a tapped fricative, most usually a plain fricative. See Northumbrian burr
Scots					Possible realization of /r/. Tapped fricative, also can be a trilled instead.

== Notes ==
Place →	Labial					Coronal										Dorsal					Laryngeal			
Manner ↓	Bilabial		Labiodental		Linguolabial		Dental		Alveolar		Postalveolar		Retroflex		(Alveolo-)palatal		Velar		Uvular		Pharyngeal/epiglottal		Glottal	
Nasal	m̥	m	ɱ̊	ɱ		n̼	n̪̊	n̪	n̥	n	n̠̊	n̠	ɳ̊	ɳ	ɲ̊	ɲ	ŋ̊	ŋ	ɴ̥	ɴ				
Plosive	p	b	p̪	b̪	t̼	d̼	t̪	d̪	t	d			ʈ	ɖ	c	ɟ	k	ɡ	q	ɢ	ʡ		ʔ	
Sibilant affricate							ts̪	dz̪	ts	dz	tʃ	dʒ	tʂ	dʐ	tɕ	dʑ								
Non-sibilant affricate	pɸ	bβ	p̪f	b̪v			tθ	dð	tɹ̝̊	dɹ̝	t̠ɹ̝̊	d̠ɹ̝			cç	ɟʝ	kx	ɡɣ	qχ	ɢʁ	ʡʜ	ʡʢ	ʔh	
Sibilant fricative							s̪	z̪	s	z	ʃ	ʒ	ʂ	ʐ	ɕ	ʑ								
Non-sibilant fricative	ɸ	β	f	v	θ̼	ð̼	θ	ð	θ̠	ð̠	ɹ̝̠̊	ɹ̠᷵	ɻ̥᷵	ɻ᷵	ç	ʝ	x	ɣ	χ	ʁ	ħ	ʕ	h	ɦ
Approximant		β̞		ʋ				ð̞		ɹ		ɹ̠		ɻ		j		ɰ						˷
Tap/flap		ⱱ̟		ⱱ					ɾ̥	ɾ			ɽ̊	ɽ						ɢ̆		ʡ̆		
Trill	ʙ̥	ʙ							r̥	r		r̠	ɽ̊r̥	ɽr					ʀ̥	ʀ	ʜ	ʢ		
Lateral affricate									tɬ	dɮ			tꞎ	d𝼅	c𝼆	ɟʎ̝	k𝼄	ɡʟ̝						
Lateral fricative							ɬ̪		ɬ	ɮ			ꞎ	𝼅	𝼆	ʎ̝	𝼄	ʟ̝						
Lateral approximant								l̪	l̥	l		l̠	ɭ̊	ɭ	ʎ̥	ʎ	ʟ̥	ʟ		ʟ̠				
Lateral tap/flap									ɺ̥	ɺ			𝼈̊	𝼈		ʎ̆		ʟ̆						

		BL	LD	D	A	PA	RF	P	V	U
Implosive	Voiced	ɓ			ɗ		ᶑ	ʄ	ɠ	ʛ
Implosive	Voiceless	ɓ̥			ɗ̥		ᶑ̊	ʄ̊	ɠ̊	ʛ̥
Ejective	Stop	pʼ			tʼ		ʈʼ	cʼ	kʼ	qʼ
Ejective	Affricate		p̪fʼ	tθʼ	tsʼ	tʃʼ	tʂʼ	tɕʼ	kxʼ	qχʼ
Ejective	Fricative	ɸʼ	fʼ	θʼ	sʼ	ʃʼ	ʂʼ	ɕʼ	xʼ	χʼ
Ejective	Lateral affricate				tɬʼ			c𝼆ʼ	k𝼄ʼ	q𝼄ʼ
Ejective	Lateral fricative				ɬʼ					
Click (top: velar; bottom: uvular)	Tenuis	kʘ qʘ		kǀ qǀ	kǃ qǃ		k𝼊 q𝼊	kǂ qǂ		
Click (top: velar; bottom: uvular)	Voiced	ɡʘ ɢʘ		ɡǀ ɢǀ	ɡǃ ɢǃ		ɡ𝼊 ɢ𝼊	ɡǂ ɢǂ		
Click (top: velar; bottom: uvular)	Nasal	ŋʘ ɴʘ		ŋǀ ɴǀ	ŋǃ ɴǃ		ŋ𝼊 ɴ𝼊	ŋǂ ɴǂ	ʞ	
Click (top: velar; bottom: uvular)	Tenuis lateral				kǁ qǁ					
Click (top: velar; bottom: uvular)	Voiced lateral				ɡǁ ɢǁ					
Click (top: velar; bottom: uvular)	Nasal lateral				ŋǁ ɴǁ					
