= Voiceless velar fricative =

Consonantal sound represented by ⟨x⟩ in IPA

x
- IPA number: 140

Audio sample
- source · help

Encoding
- Entity (decimal): &#120;
- Unicode (hex): U+0078
- X-SAMPA: x
- Braille: ⠭ (braille pattern dots-1346)
Image

A voiceless velar fricative is a type of consonantal sound used in some spoken languages. It was part of the consonant inventory of Old English and can still be found in some modern dialects of English, most notably in Scottish English, for example in loch, broch, and saugh (willow).

The symbol in the International Phonetic Alphabet that represents this sound is ⟨x⟩, the Latin letter x. It is also used in broad transcription instead of the symbol ⟨χ⟩, the Greek chi, for the voiceless uvular fricative.

For a voiceless pre-velar fricative (also called post-palatal), see voiceless palatal fricative § Post-palatal.

== Features ==
Sagittal section of a voiceless velar fricative

Features of a voiceless velar fricative:

- Its manner of articulation is fricative, which means it is produced by constricting air flow through a narrow channel at the place of articulation, causing turbulence.
- Its place of articulation is velar, which means it is articulated with the back of the tongue (the dorsum) at the soft palate.
- Its phonation is voiceless, which means it is produced without vibrations of the vocal cords. In some languages the vocal cords are actively separated, so it is always voiceless; in others the cords are lax, so that it may take on the voicing of adjacent sounds.
- It is an oral consonant, which means that air is not allowed to escape through the nose.
- It is a median consonant, which means it is produced by directing the airstream down the midline of the tongue, rather than to the sides.
- Its airstream mechanism is pulmonic, which means it is articulated by pushing air only with the intercostal muscles and abdominal muscles, as in most speech sounds.

== Occurrence ==
A voiceless velar fricative and its labialized variety are postulated to have occurred in Proto-Germanic, the ancestor of the Germanic languages, as the reflex of the Proto-Indo-European voiceless palatal and velar stops and the labialized voiceless velar stop. Thus Proto-Indo-European *ḱr̥nom "horn" and *kʷód "what" became Proto-Germanic *hurnan and *hwat, where *h and *hw were likely [x] and [xʷ]. This sound change is part of Grimm's law.

In Modern Greek, a voiceless velar fricative originated from the Ancient Greek voiceless aspirated stop /kʰ/ in a sound change that lenited all Greek aspirated stops to fricatives.

| Language | | Word | IPA | Meaning | Notes |
|---|---|---|---|---|---|
| Abaza | | хьзы / xzë | [xʲzə] | 'name' | |
| Adyghe | | хы / xë | [xəː] | 'six' | |
| Afrikaans | | groot | [xrʊət] | 'big' | More often realized as uvular [χ ~ ʀ̥]. See Afrikaans phonology |
| Albanian | | gjuha | [ɟuxɑ] | 'language' | Allophone of /h/. See Albanian phonology |
| Aleut | Atkan dialect | alax | [ɑlɑx] | 'two' | |
| Arabic | Modern Standard | خ‍‍ض‍راء | [xɑdˤˈrɑːʔ] | 'green' (f.) | May be velar, post-velar or uvular, depending on dialect. See Arabic phonology |
| Assamese | | অসমীয়া / oxomia | [ɔxɔmia] | 'Assamese' | |
| Assyrian | | ܚܡܫܐ / xemša | [xεmʃa] | 'five' | |
| Avar | | чeхь / čex | [tʃex] | 'belly' | |
| Azerbaijani | | xoş / хош / ﺧﻮش | [xoʃ] | 'pleasant' | |
| Basque | Some speakers | jan | [xän] | 'to eat' | Either velar or post-velar. For other speakers it's [j ~ ʝ ~ ɟ]. |
| Blackfoot | | ᖻᖳᐦᓱᖽᐧ / naaáhsiksi | [naːáxsik͡si̥] | 'my grandparents' | Sometimes /x/ becomes allophone /h/ in beginning of words like "hánnia!" ("really!") Or becomes allphone /ç/ after i/ii like ihkitsika seven. |
| Brahui | | ﺧ‍ﻦ / xan | [xan] | 'eye' | Corresponds to /x/ in Kurukh and /q/ in Malto. |
| Breton | | hor c'hi | [hor xiː] | 'our dog' | |
| Bulgarian | | тихо / tiho | [ˈt̪ixo] | 'quietly' | Described as having "only slight friction" ([x̞]). |
| Catalan | | kharja | [ˈxɑɾ(d͡)ʑə] | 'kharja' | Found in loanwords and interjections. See Catalan phonology |
| Chechen | | хан / xan | [xɑːn] | 'time' | |
| Chinese | Mandarin | 河 / hé | [xɤ˧˥] | 'river' | See Standard Chinese phonology |
| Czech | | Čech | [t͡ʃɛx] | 'a Czech' | See Czech phonology |
| Danish | Southern Jutlandic | kage | [ˈkʰaːx] | 'cake' | See Sønderjysk dialect |
| Dutch | Standard Belgian | loochen | [ˈloː.xən] | 'deny' | May be post-palatal [ç̠] instead. In dialects spoken above the rivers Rhine, Meuse and Waal the corresponding sound is a postvelar-uvular fricative trill [ʀ̝̊˖]. See Dutch phonology and Hard and soft G in Dutch |
| Dutch | Southern Netherlands accents | loochen | [ˈloː.xən] | 'deny' | May be post-palatal [ç̠] instead. In dialects spoken above the rivers Rhine, Meuse and Waal the corresponding sound is a postvelar-uvular fricative trill [ʀ̝̊˖]. See Dutch phonology and Hard and soft G in Dutch |
| English | Scottish | loch | [ɫɔx] | 'loch' | Younger speakers may merge this sound with /k/. See Scottish English phonology |
| English | Irish | lough | [lɑx] | 'lough' | Occurs only in Gaelic borrowings. See Irish English phonology |
| English | Scouse | book | [bʉːx] | 'book' | A syllable-final allophone of /k/ (lenition). |
| Esperanto | | monaĥo | [moˈnaxo] | 'monk' | See Esperanto phonology |
| Estonian | | jah | [jɑx] | 'yes' | Allophone of /h/. See Estonian phonology |
| Eyak | | duxł | [tʊxɬ] | 'traps' | |
| Finnish | | kahvi | [ˈkɑxʋi] | 'coffee' | Allophone of /h/. See Finnish phonology |
| French | | jota | [xɔta] | 'jota' | Occurs only in loanwords (from Spanish, Arabic, Chinese, etc.). See French phonology |
| Georgian | | ჯოხი / joxi | [ˈdʒɔxi] | 'stick' | |
| German | | Buch | [buːx] | 'book' | See Standard German phonology |
| Greek | | τέχνη / téchnî | [ˈte̞xni] | 'art' | See Modern Greek phonology |
| Hebrew | Biblical | מִיכָאֵל / Mîḵāʾēl | [mixaˈʔel] | 'Michael' | See Biblical Hebrew phonology |
| Hebrew | Sephardic | מִיכָאֵל / Mîḵāʾēl | [mixaˈʔel] | 'Michael' | |
| Hindustani | Hindi | ख़ुशी / xuśī | [xʊʃiː] | 'happiness' | Occurs only in loanwords. May be replaced in Hindi with /kʰ/. Can be retracted. See Hindustani phonology |
| Hindustani | Urdu | ﺧ‍وشی / xuśī | [xʊʃiː] | 'happiness' | Occurs only in loanwords. May be replaced in Hindi with /kʰ/. Can be retracted. See Hindustani phonology |
| Hungarian | | sahhal | [ʃɒxːɒl] | 'with a shah' | See Hungarian phonology |
| Icelandic | | október | [ˈɔxtoːupɛr̥] | 'October' | See Icelandic phonology |
| Indonesian | | khas | [xas] | 'typical' | Occurs in Arabic loanwords. Often pronounced as [h] or [k] by some Indonesians. See Indonesian phonology |
| Irish | | deoch | [dʲɔ̝̈x] | 'drink' | See Irish phonology |
| Japanese | | マッハ / mahha | [maxːa] | 'Mach' | Allophone of /h/. See Japanese phonology |
| Kabardian | | хы / khy | [xəː] | 'sea' | |
| Karen | S'gaw Karen | ဃံလၤ | [xí lā] | 'beautiful; very attractive' | |
| Karen | Eastern Pwo | ၰိုင် | [xə̀ɴ] | 'mushroom, fungus' | |
| Karen | Western Pwo | ဎၩ့ၥၪ | [xáɴ θà] | 'marian fruit' | |
| Kashmiri | | خَر | [xar] | 'donkey' | |
| Kazakh | | ханзада / hanzada | [xanzada] | 'prince' | |
| Korean | | 흥정 / heungjeong | [xɯŋd͡ʑʌ̹ŋ] | 'bargaining' | Allophone of /h/ before /ɯ/. See Korean phonology |
| Kurdish | | xanî | [xɑːˈniː] | 'house' | See Kurdish phonology |
| Kurukh | | कुँड़ुख़/kũṛux | [kũɽux] | 'Kurukh' | Corresponds to /x/ in Brahui and /q/ in Malto. |
| Limburgish | | loch | [lɔx] | 'air' | The example word is from the Maastrichtian dialect. See Maastrichtian dialect phonology and Hard and soft G in Dutch |
| Lishan Didan | Urmi dialect | חלבא / xalwa | [xalwɑ] | 'milk' | Generally post-velar |
| Lithuanian | | choras | [ˈxɔrɐs̪] | 'choir' | Occurs only in loanwords (usually international words) |
| Lojban | | xatra | [xatra] | 'letter' | |
| Macedonian | | Охрид / Ohrid | [ˈɔxrit] | 'Ohrid' | See Macedonian phonology |
| Malay | | اﺧ‍ير / akhir | [axir] | 'last', 'end' | Occurs in Arabic loanwords. Often pronounced as [h] or [k]. See Malay phonology |
| Malay | | khidmat | [xid̪maʔ] | 'service' | Allophone of /kʰ/. See Malay phonology |
| Manx | | aashagh | [ˈɛːʒax] | 'easy' | |
| Munsee | | naxk | [nəxk] | 'hand' | |
| Nepali | | आँखा / ā̃khā | [ä̃xä] | 'eye' | Allophone of /kʰ/. See Nepali phonology |
| Norwegian | Urban East | hat | [xɑːt] | 'hate' | Possible allophone of /h/ near back vowels; can be voiced [ɣ] between two voiced sounds. See Norwegian phonology |
| Pashto | | اخ‍‍ته / axta | [ax.t̪a] | 'occupied' | See Pashto phonology |
| Persian | Dari | دختر / duxtar | [d̪ʊxˈt̪aɾ] | 'daughter' | Realized as a distinct velar phoneme /x/, contrasting with Iranian /χ/. |
| Persian | Iranian | میخ‌کش / mixkeš | [miːxˈke̞ʃ] | 'nail puller' | Allophone of /χ/ before velar consonants. See Persian phonology. |
| Polish | | chleb | [xlɛp] | 'bread' | Also (in great majority of dialects) represented orthographically by ⟨h⟩. See Polish phonology |
| Portuguese | Fluminense | arte | [ˈaxtɕi] | 'art' | In free variation with [χ], [ʁ], [ħ] and [h] before voiceless consonants |
| Portuguese | General Brazilian | rosa | [ˈxɔzɐ] | 'rose' | Some dialects. An allophone of /ʁ/. See Portuguese phonology |
| Punjabi | Gurmukhi | ਖ਼ਬਰ / xabar | [xəbəɾ] | 'news' | Less frequent and may merge with /kʰ/ in Gurmukhi varieties. |
| Punjabi | Shahmukhi | خ‍‍بر / xabar | [xəbəɾ] | 'news' | Less frequent and may merge with /kʰ/ in Gurmukhi varieties. |
| Romanian | | hram | [xräm] | 'patronal feast of a church' | Allophone of /h/. See Romanian phonology |
| Russian | | хороший / horošij | [xɐˈr̠ʷo̞ʂɨ̞j] | 'good' | See Russian phonology |
| Scottish Gaelic | | drochaid | [ˈt̪ɾɔxɪtʲ] | 'bridge' | See Scottish Gaelic phonology |
| Serbo-Croatian | | храст / hrast | [xrâːst] | 'oak' | See Serbo-Croatian phonology |
| Slovak | | chlap | [xɫäp] | 'guy' | |
| Slovene | Standard | pohlep | [poˈxlɛ̂p] | 'greed' | See Slovene phonology |
| Slovene | Some dialects | bog | [ˈbôːx] | 'god' | Allophone of /ɣ/ before voiceless obstruents or pause. See Slovene phonology |
| Somali | | khad | [xad] | 'ink' | Also occurs allophone of /q/ in Arabic loan words. See Somali phonology |
| Spanish | Peninsular | ojo | [ˈo̞xo̞] | 'eye' | May be glottal instead (in some southern Peninsular and Latin American regions). In northern and central Spain it is often post-velar or uvular. See Spanish phonology |
| Spanish | Latin American | ojo | [ˈo̞xo̞] | 'eye' | May be glottal instead (in some southern Peninsular and Latin American regions). In northern and central Spain it is often post-velar or uvular. See Spanish phonology |
| Swedish | Southern dialects | sjö | [xøː] | 'lake' | See Swedish phonology |
| Sylheti | | ꠈꠛꠞ / xobor | [xɔ́bɔɾ] | 'news' | |
| Tachelhit | | ixf | [ixf] | 'head' | |
| Tagalog | | bakit | [baxit] | 'why' | Allophone of /k/ in intervocalic positions. See Tagalog phonology |
| Tamil | Brahmin Tamil, Sri Lankan Tamil (non-standard) | பகை/pakai | [pɐxɛ(i̯)] | 'hate' | Intervocalic singular /k/ has debuccalized for most except in Brahmin and Sri Lankan Tamil. In total it can be [kʰ x ɡ ɣ ɣʰ h] |
| Toda | | [pax] | | 'smoke' | |
| Turkish | | ıhlamur | [ɯxlämuɾ] | 'linden' | Allophone of /h/. See Turkish phonology |
| Turkmen | | hile | [xiːle] | 'cunning' (noun) | |
| Tyap | | kham | [xam] | 'calabash', 'prostitute' | |
| Xhosa | | rhoxisa | [xɔkǁiːsa] | 'to cancel' | |
| Ukrainian | | хлопець / hlopeć | [ˈxɫɔ̝pɛt͡sʲ] | 'boy' | See Ukrainian phonology |
| Unami | | skixkwe | [skiːxkwe] | 'young woman' | |
| Uzbek | | oxirgi | [ɒxirgi] | 'last' | Post-velar. Occurs in environments different from word-initially and pre-consonantally, otherwise it is pre-velar. |
| Vietnamese | | không | [xəwŋ͡m˧] | 'no', 'not', 'zero' | See Vietnamese phonology |
| Yaghan | | xan | [xan] | 'here' | |
| Yi | | ꉾ / he | [xɤ˧] | 'good' | |
| Zapotec | Tilquiapan | mejor | [mɘxoɾ] | 'better' | Used primarily in loanwords from Spanish |

== See also ==
- Guttural
- Index of phonetics articles

== Notes ==
| Place → | Labial | | | | | Coronal | | | | | | | | | | Dorsal | | | | | Laryngeal | | | |
| Manner ↓ | Bilabial | | Labiodental | | Linguolabial | | Dental | | Alveolar | | Postalveolar | | Retroflex | | (Alveolo-)palatal | | Velar | | Uvular | | Pharyngeal/epiglottal | | Glottal | |
|---|---|---|---|---|---|---|---|---|---|---|---|---|---|---|---|---|---|---|---|---|---|---|---|---|
| Nasal | m̥ | m | ɱ̊ | ɱ | | n̼ | n̪̊ | n̪ | n̥ | n | n̠̊ | n̠ | ɳ̊ | ɳ | ɲ̊ | ɲ | ŋ̊ | ŋ | ɴ̥ | ɴ | | | | |
| Plosive | p | b | p̪ | b̪ | t̼ | d̼ | t̪ | d̪ | t | d | | | ʈ | ɖ | c | ɟ | k | ɡ | q | ɢ | ʡ | | ʔ | |
| Sibilant affricate | | | | | | | t̪s̪ | d̪z̪ | ts | dz | t̠ʃ | d̠ʒ | tʂ | dʐ | tɕ | dʑ | | | | | | | | |
| Non-sibilant affricate | pɸ | bβ | p̪f | b̪v | | | t̪θ | d̪ð | tɹ̝̊ | dɹ̝ | t̠ɹ̠̊˔ | d̠ɹ̠˔ | | | cç | ɟʝ | kx | ɡɣ | qχ | ɢʁ | ʡʜ | ʡʢ | ʔh | |
| Sibilant fricative | | | | | | | s̪ | z̪ | s | z | ʃ | ʒ | ʂ | ʐ | ɕ | ʑ | | | | | | | | |
| Non-sibilant fricative | ɸ | β | f | v | θ̼ | ð̼ | θ | ð | θ̠ | ð̠ | ɹ̠̊˔ | ɹ̠˔ | ɻ̊˔ | ɻ˔ | ç | ʝ | x | ɣ | χ | ʁ | ħ | ʕ | h | ɦ |
| Approximant | | β̞ | | ʋ | | | | ð̞ | | ɹ | | ɹ̠ | | ɻ | | j | | ɰ | | | | | | ˷ |
| Tap/flap | | ⱱ̟ | | ⱱ | | | | | ɾ̥ | ɾ | | | ɽ̊ | ɽ | | | | | | ɢ̆ | | ʡ̆ | | |
| Trill | ʙ̥ | ʙ | | | | | | | r̥ | r | | r̠ | ɽ̊r̥ | ɽr | | | | | ʀ̥ | ʀ | ʜ | ʢ | | |
| Lateral affricate | | | | | | | | | tɬ | dɮ | | | tꞎ | d𝼅 | c𝼆 | ɟʎ̝ | k𝼄 | ɡʟ̝ | | | | | | |
| Lateral fricative | | | | | | | ɬ̪ | | ɬ | ɮ | | | ꞎ | 𝼅 | 𝼆 | ʎ̝ | 𝼄 | ʟ̝ | | | | | | |
| Lateral approximant | | | | | | | | l̪ | l̥ | l | | l̠ | ɭ̊ | ɭ | ʎ̥ | ʎ | ʟ̥ | ʟ | | ʟ̠ | | | | |
| Lateral tap/flap | | | | | | | | | ɺ̥ | ɺ | | | 𝼈̊ | 𝼈 | | ʎ̆ | | ʟ̆ | | | | | | |

| | | BL | LD | D | A | PA | RF | P | V | U |
|---|---|---|---|---|---|---|---|---|---|---|
| Implosive | Voiced | ɓ | | | ɗ | | ᶑ | ʄ | ɠ | ʛ |
| Implosive | Voiceless | ɓ̥ | | | ɗ̥ | | ᶑ̊ | ʄ̊ | ɠ̊ | ʛ̥ |
| Ejective | Stop | pʼ | | | tʼ | | ʈʼ | cʼ | kʼ | qʼ |
| Ejective | Affricate | | p̪fʼ | tθʼ | tsʼ | tʃʼ | tʂʼ | tɕʼ | kxʼ | qχʼ |
| Ejective | Fricative | ɸʼ | fʼ | θʼ | sʼ | ʃʼ | ʂʼ | ɕʼ | xʼ | χʼ |
| Ejective | Lateral affricate | | | | tɬʼ | | | c𝼆ʼ | k𝼄ʼ | q𝼄ʼ |
| Ejective | Lateral fricative | | | | ɬʼ | | | | | |
| Click (top: velar; bottom: uvular) | Tenuis | kʘ qʘ | | kǀ qǀ | kǃ qǃ | | k𝼊 q𝼊 | kǂ qǂ | | |
| Click (top: velar; bottom: uvular) | Voiced | ɡʘ ɢʘ | | ɡǀ ɢǀ | ɡǃ ɢǃ | | ɡ𝼊 ɢ𝼊 | ɡǂ ɢǂ | | |
| Click (top: velar; bottom: uvular) | Nasal | ŋʘ ɴʘ | | ŋǀ ɴǀ | ŋǃ ɴǃ | | ŋ𝼊 ɴ𝼊 | ŋǂ ɴǂ | ʞ | |
| Click (top: velar; bottom: uvular) | Tenuis lateral | | | | kǁ qǁ | | | | | |
| Click (top: velar; bottom: uvular) | Voiced lateral | | | | ɡǁ ɢǁ | | | | | |
| Click (top: velar; bottom: uvular) | Nasal lateral | | | | ŋǁ ɴǁ | | | | | |
