= Dorsal consonant =

Consonants articulated with the back of the tongue

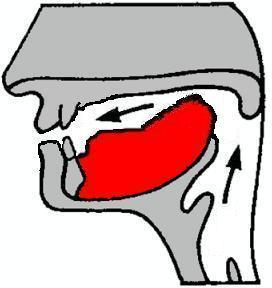
Velar phonetics.

Dorsal consonants are consonants articulated with the back of the tongue (the dorsum). They include the uvular, velar and, in some cases (depending on the analysis), alveolo-palatal and palatal consonants. They contrast with labial consonants (articulated with the lips and without the tongue), coronal consonants (articulated with the flexible front of the tongue), and laryngeal consonants (articulated with either the root of the tongue, the epiglottis, or the glottis).

== Characteristics ==
The dorsum of the tongue can contact a broad region of the roof of the mouth, from the hard palate (palatal consonants), to the flexible velum (velar consonants) behind the hard palate, to the uvula at the back of the mouth cavity (uvular consonants). These distinctions are not clear cut, and sometimes finer gradations such as prepalatal, postpalatal, prevelar, postvelar, and preuvular will be used.

Because the tip of the tongue can curl back to also contact the hard palate for retroflex consonants (subapical-palatal), consonants produced by contact between the dorsum and the palate are sometimes called dorso-palatal.

== Examples ==
Familiar dorsal consonants
IPA	Description	Example		
IPA	Description	Language	Orthography	IPA
ɲ	Voiced palatal nasal	Albanian	një	[ɲə]
ʝ	Voiced palatal fricative	Modern Greek	για	[ʝa]
ç	Voiceless palatal fricative	German	Reich	[ʁaɪ̯ç]
j	Voiced palatal approximant	English	yellow	[ˈjɛloʊ]
ŋ	Voiced velar nasal	English	sing	[ˈsɪŋ]
ɡ	Voiced velar plosive	English	garden	[ˈɡɑː(ɹ)dn̩]
k	Voiceless velar plosive	English	cake	[ˈkeɪk]
ɣ	Voiced velar fricative	Modern Greek	góma (γόμα)	[ˈɣoma]
x	Voiceless velar fricative	Scottish English	loch	[ˈlox]
ʍ	Voiceless labio-velar approximant	Scottish English	whine	[ˈʍaɪn]
w	Voiced labio-velar approximant	RP English	water	[ˈwɔːtə]
q	Voiceless uvular plosive	Arabic	Qurʾān (قرآن)	[qurʔaːn]
ɢ	Voiced uvular plosive	Persian	Qom (قم)	[ɢom]
ʁ	Voiced uvular fricative or approximant	French	Paris	[paʁi]
χ	Voiceless uvular fricative	German	Bach	[baχ]

== See also ==
- Place of articulation
- List of phonetics topics

Place →	Labial					Coronal										Dorsal					Laryngeal			
Manner ↓	Bilabial		Labiodental		Linguolabial		Dental		Alveolar		Postalveolar		Retroflex		(Alveolo-)palatal		Velar		Uvular		Pharyngeal/epiglottal		Glottal	
Nasal	m̥	m	ɱ̊	ɱ		n̼	n̪̊	n̪	n̥	n	n̠̊	n̠	ɳ̊	ɳ	ɲ̊	ɲ	ŋ̊	ŋ	ɴ̥	ɴ				
Plosive	p	b	p̪	b̪	t̼	d̼	t̪	d̪	t	d			ʈ	ɖ	c	ɟ	k	ɡ	q	ɢ	ʡ		ʔ	
Sibilant affricate							t̪s̪	d̪z̪	ts	dz	t̠ʃ	d̠ʒ	tʂ	dʐ	tɕ	dʑ								
Non-sibilant affricate	pɸ	bβ	p̪f	b̪v			t̪θ	d̪ð	tɹ̝̊	dɹ̝	t̠ɹ̠̊˔	d̠ɹ̠˔			cç	ɟʝ	kx	ɡɣ	qχ	ɢʁ	ʡʜ	ʡʢ	ʔh	
Sibilant fricative							s̪	z̪	s	z	ʃ	ʒ	ʂ	ʐ	ɕ	ʑ								
Non-sibilant fricative	ɸ	β	f	v	θ̼	ð̼	θ	ð	θ̠	ð̠	ɹ̠̊˔	ɹ̠˔	ɻ̊˔	ɻ˔	ç	ʝ	x	ɣ	χ	ʁ	ħ	ʕ	h	ɦ
Approximant		β̞		ʋ				ð̞		ɹ		ɹ̠		ɻ		j		ɰ						˷
Tap/flap		ⱱ̟		ⱱ					ɾ̥	ɾ			ɽ̊	ɽ						ɢ̆		ʡ̆		
Trill	ʙ̥	ʙ							r̥	r		r̠	ɽ̊r̥	ɽr					ʀ̥	ʀ	ʜ	ʢ		
Lateral affricate									tɬ	dɮ			tꞎ	d𝼅	c𝼆	ɟʎ̝	k𝼄	ɡʟ̝						
Lateral fricative							ɬ̪		ɬ	ɮ			ꞎ	𝼅	𝼆	ʎ̝	𝼄	ʟ̝						
Lateral approximant								l̪	l̥	l		l̠	ɭ̊	ɭ	ʎ̥	ʎ	ʟ̥	ʟ		ʟ̠				
Lateral tap/flap									ɺ̥	ɺ			𝼈̊	𝼈		ʎ̆		ʟ̆						

		BL	LD	D	A	PA	RF	P	V	U
Implosive	Voiced	ɓ			ɗ		ᶑ	ʄ	ɠ	ʛ
Implosive	Voiceless	ɓ̥			ɗ̥		ᶑ̊	ʄ̊	ɠ̊	ʛ̥
Ejective	Stop	pʼ			tʼ		ʈʼ	cʼ	kʼ	qʼ
Ejective	Affricate		p̪fʼ	t̪θʼ	tsʼ	t̠ʃʼ	tʂʼ	tɕʼ	kxʼ	qχʼ
Ejective	Fricative	ɸʼ	fʼ	θʼ	sʼ	ʃʼ	ʂʼ	ɕʼ	xʼ	χʼ
Ejective	Lateral affricate				tɬʼ			c𝼆ʼ	k𝼄ʼ	q𝼄ʼ
Ejective	Lateral fricative				ɬʼ					
Click (top: velar; bottom: uvular)	Tenuis	kʘ qʘ		kǀ qǀ	kǃ qǃ		k𝼊 q𝼊	kǂ qǂ		
Click (top: velar; bottom: uvular)	Voiced	ɡʘ ɢʘ		ɡǀ ɢǀ	ɡǃ ɢǃ		ɡ𝼊 ɢ𝼊	ɡǂ ɢǂ		
Click (top: velar; bottom: uvular)	Nasal	ŋʘ ɴʘ		ŋǀ ɴǀ	ŋǃ ɴǃ		ŋ𝼊 ɴ𝼊	ŋǂ ɴǂ	ʞ	
Click (top: velar; bottom: uvular)	Tenuis lateral				kǁ qǁ					
Click (top: velar; bottom: uvular)	Voiced lateral				ɡǁ ɢǁ					
Click (top: velar; bottom: uvular)	Nasal lateral				ŋǁ ɴǁ					
