= Vowel diagram =

Schematic arrangement of vowels

A representation of Daniel Jones's original cardinal vowel trapezium, which served as a basis for later vowel diagrams (though not the first of its kind; the original 1900 IPA chart had a somewhat similar form).

A vowel diagram or vowel chart is a schematic arrangement of vowels within a phonetic system (though also often used in phonemic descriptions). Vowels do not differ in place, manner, or voicing in the same way that consonants do. Instead, vowels are distinguished primarily based on their height (vertical position), backness (horizontal position), and roundedness (lip articulation). The degrees of height and backness may be used to describe either tongue articulation or acoustic quality, depending on the method of analysis. The former is the more traditional method, while the latter is the more modern method.

The vowel systems of all languages can be represented by vowel diagrams. Usually, there is a pattern of even distribution of vowel placement on the diagram, a phenomenon that is known as vowel dispersion. Most languages have a vowel system with three extreme points, forming a vowel triangle. Only 10% of languages, including English, have a vowel system with four extremes. Such a diagram is called a vowel quadrilateral or a vowel trapezium.

Alternatively, these shape-based terms are used to distinguish the method of analysis used for vowel diagrams: vowel triangles for diagrams typically based on § acoustics, and vowel quadrilaterals for diagrams typically based on § articulation. As such, languages which have three extremes may still be plotted within a vowel quadrilateral, and languages which have four extremes may still be represented with a vowel triangle.

== By articulation ==
The IPA vowel trapezium. Vowels in most languages are not so extreme, and fall somewhere within the chart rather than at its absolute bounds.

The vowel diagram of the International Phonetic Alphabet is based on the cardinal vowel system, displayed in the form of a trapezium. In the diagram, convenient reference points are provided for specifying tongue position. The position of the highest point of the arch of the tongue is considered to be the point of articulation of the vowel.

- The vertical dimension denotes vowel height, with close vowels at the top and open vowels at the bottom of the diagram. For example, the vowel [i] is articulated with a close (high) tongue position, while the vowel [a] is articulated with an open (low) tongue position. In between these are five additional degrees: near-close, close-mid, mid, open-mid, and near-open.
- The horizontal dimension denotes vowel backness, with front vowels on the left and back vowels (or, under some analyses, raised vowels and retracted vowels) on the right of the diagram. For example, the vowel [i] is articulated with the tongue further forward, while the vowel [u] is articulated with the tongue further back. In between these are three additional degrees: near-front, central, and near-back.
- Vowels are categorized by their roundedness, either rounded or unrounded. For example, the vowel [u] is articulated with rounded lips, while the vowel [i] is articulated with spread lips. For positions on the diagram where both rounded and unrounded vowels exist, rounded vowels are placed right adjacent to their unrounded counterparts. Both rounded and unrounded vowels may be further broken down into subgroups to more precisely describe lip articulation (see Roundedness § Typology), but such distinctions have no conventional mapping, and are instead represented by use of different vowel symbols or diacritics.

In the IPA Handbook, the vowels [i u a ɑ] are regarded as fixed articulatory reference points, with precise tongue positioning, while the remaining vowels are defined "so that the differences between each vowel and the next in the series are auditorily equal". As such, the Handbook concedes:

The use of auditory spacing in the definition of these vowels means vowel description is not based purely on articulation, and is one reason why the vowel quadrilateral must be regarded as an abstraction and not a direct mapping of tongue position.

A vowel chart for southern California English, showing how its vowels lie within the IPA vowel trapezium.

By definition, no vowel sound can be plotted outside of the IPA trapezium because its four corners represent the extreme points of articulation. The vowel diagrams of most real languages are not so extreme. In English, for example, high vowels are articulated lower than in the IPA trapezium, and front vowels are articulated further back. As such, vowel diagrams are often transcribed with broader vowel phonemes rather than narrower vowel phones, omitting the usage of diacritics; the latter may be visually interpreted from a given diagram. This is also the case as vowel diagrams typically intend to represent averages among speakers of a language, rather than definitive placements for all individuals.

Vowels may also be categorized by their perceived tenseness, with lax vowels being positioned more mid-centralized on vowel diagrams than their tense counterparts. The vowel [ə] is in the center of the IPA trapezium and is frequently referred to as the neutral vowel, due to its fully lax articulation. In many languages, including English, the vowels [ɪ] and [ʊ] are often considered lax variants of their tense counterparts [i] and [u], and are placed more mid-centralized in the IPA trapezium. For related cases, see vowel reduction and checked and free vowels.

== By acoustics ==
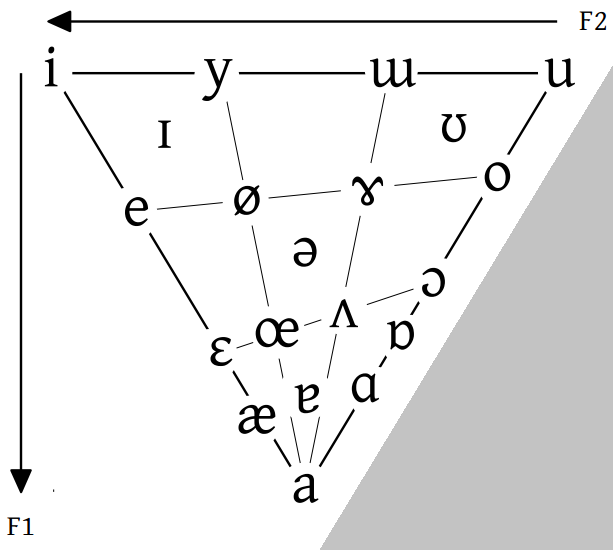
A schematic vowel triangle following Geoff Lindsey's stylization of the vowel space. The chart uses the first two formants on its axes.

Different vowels vary in pitch. For example, high vowels, such as [i] and [u], tend to have a higher fundamental frequency than low vowels, such as [a]. Vowels are distinct from one another by their acoustic form or spectral properties. Spectral properties are the speech sound's fundamental frequency and its formants.

According to Peter Ladefoged:

[E]arly phoneticians [...] thought they were describing the highest point of the tongue, but they were not. They were actually describing formant frequencies.

A plot of the average formants of a male speaker.

Each vowel in the vowel diagram has a unique first and second formant, or F_{1} and F_{2}. The frequency of the first formant is associated with the width of the pharyngeal cavity and the position of the tongue on a vertical axis, and ranges from open to close. The frequency of the second formant refers to the length of the oral cavity and the position of the tongue on a horizontal axis. [i], [u], [a] are often referred to as point vowels because they represent the most extreme F_{1} and F_{2} frequencies. [a] has a high F_{1} frequency because of the narrow size of the pharynx and the low position of the tongue. The F_{2} frequency is higher for [i] because the oral cavity is short and the tongue is fronted in the mouth. The F_{2} frequency is low in the production of [u] because the mouth is elongated and the lips are rounded while the pharynx is lowered.

F_{1} and F_{2} are not the only formants used to measure vowels. The third formant, or F_{3}, is also often used for measuring vowel quality, but it is not typically demonstrated on a dual-axis chart as F_{1} and F_{2} are. The lowering of F_{3} is commonly associated with front rounded vowels, such as [œ], and r-colored vowels, such as [ɚ]; the latter to a much greater degree, being a marked characteristic of r-colored vowels.

== IPA vowel diagram with added material ==
IPA: Vowels

| | Front | Central | Back |
|---|---|---|---|
| Close | i y | ɨ ʉ | ɯ u |
| Near-close | ɪ ʏ | | ʊ |
| Close-mid | e ø | ɘ ɵ | ɤ o |
| Mid | e̞ ø̞ | ə | ɤ̞ o̞ |
| Open-mid | ɛ œ | ɜ ɞ | ʌ ɔ |
| Near-open | æ | ɐ |
| Open | a ɶ | ä | ɑ ɒ |

- IPA help
- audio
- full chart
- template

Legend: unrounded • rounded

The official vowel chart of the International Phonetic Alphabet does not include vowel symbols with added diacritics as shown here, and only gives labels for the heights "close", "close-mid", "open-mid", and "open" (shown here in bold).

== See also ==
- IPA vowel chart with audio
- IPA consonant chart with audio

| Place → | Labial | | | | | Coronal | | | | | | | | | | Dorsal | | | | | Laryngeal | | | |
| Manner ↓ | Bilabial | | Labiodental | | Linguolabial | | Dental | | Alveolar | | Postalveolar | | Retroflex | | (Alveolo-)palatal | | Velar | | Uvular | | Pharyngeal/epiglottal | | Glottal | |
|---|---|---|---|---|---|---|---|---|---|---|---|---|---|---|---|---|---|---|---|---|---|---|---|---|
| Nasal | m̥ | m | ɱ̊ | ɱ | | n̼ | n̪̊ | n̪ | n̥ | n | n̠̊ | n̠ | ɳ̊ | ɳ | ɲ̊ | ɲ | ŋ̊ | ŋ | ɴ̥ | ɴ | | | | |
| Plosive | p | b | p̪ | b̪ | t̼ | d̼ | t̪ | d̪ | t | d | | | ʈ | ɖ | c | ɟ | k | ɡ | q | ɢ | ʡ | | ʔ | |
| Sibilant affricate | | | | | | | ts̪ | dz̪ | ts | dz | tʃ | dʒ | tʂ | dʐ | tɕ | dʑ | | | | | | | | |
| Non-sibilant affricate | pɸ | bβ | p̪f | b̪v | | | tθ | dð | tɹ̝̊ | dɹ̝ | t̠ɹ̝̊ | d̠ɹ̝ | | | cç | ɟʝ | kx | ɡɣ | qχ | ɢʁ | ʡʜ | ʡʢ | ʔh | |
| Sibilant fricative | | | | | | | s̪ | z̪ | s | z | ʃ | ʒ | ʂ | ʐ | ɕ | ʑ | | | | | | | | |
| Non-sibilant fricative | ɸ | β | f | v | θ̼ | ð̼ | θ | ð | θ̠ | ð̠ | ɹ̝̠̊ | ɹ̠᷵ | ɻ̥᷵ | ɻ᷵ | ç | ʝ | x | ɣ | χ | ʁ | ħ | ʕ | h | ɦ |
| Approximant | | β̞ | | ʋ | | | | ð̞ | | ɹ | | ɹ̠ | | ɻ | | j | | ɰ | | | | | | ˷ |
| Tap/flap | | ⱱ̟ | | ⱱ | | | | | ɾ̥ | ɾ | | | ɽ̊ | ɽ | | | | | | ɢ̆ | | ʡ̆ | | |
| Trill | ʙ̥ | ʙ | | | | | | | r̥ | r | | r̠ | ɽ̊r̥ | ɽr | | | | | ʀ̥ | ʀ | ʜ | ʢ | | |
| Lateral affricate | | | | | | | | | tɬ | dɮ | | | tꞎ | d𝼅 | c𝼆 | ɟʎ̝ | k𝼄 | ɡʟ̝ | | | | | | |
| Lateral fricative | | | | | | | ɬ̪ | | ɬ | ɮ | | | ꞎ | 𝼅 | 𝼆 | ʎ̝ | 𝼄 | ʟ̝ | | | | | | |
| Lateral approximant | | | | | | | | l̪ | l̥ | l | | l̠ | ɭ̊ | ɭ | ʎ̥ | ʎ | ʟ̥ | ʟ | | ʟ̠ | | | | |
| Lateral tap/flap | | | | | | | | | ɺ̥ | ɺ | | | 𝼈̊ | 𝼈 | | ʎ̆ | | ʟ̆ | | | | | | |

| | | BL | LD | D | A | PA | RF | P | V | U |
|---|---|---|---|---|---|---|---|---|---|---|
| Implosive | Voiced | ɓ | | | ɗ | | ᶑ | ʄ | ɠ | ʛ |
| Implosive | Voiceless | ɓ̥ | | | ɗ̥ | | ᶑ̊ | ʄ̊ | ɠ̊ | ʛ̥ |
| Ejective | Stop | pʼ | | | tʼ | | ʈʼ | cʼ | kʼ | qʼ |
| Ejective | Affricate | | p̪fʼ | tθʼ | tsʼ | tʃʼ | tʂʼ | tɕʼ | kxʼ | qχʼ |
| Ejective | Fricative | ɸʼ | fʼ | θʼ | sʼ | ʃʼ | ʂʼ | ɕʼ | xʼ | χʼ |
| Ejective | Lateral affricate | | | | tɬʼ | | | c𝼆ʼ | k𝼄ʼ | q𝼄ʼ |
| Ejective | Lateral fricative | | | | ɬʼ | | | | | |
| Click (top: velar; bottom: uvular) | Tenuis | kʘ qʘ | | kǀ qǀ | kǃ qǃ | | k𝼊 q𝼊 | kǂ qǂ | | |
| Click (top: velar; bottom: uvular) | Voiced | ɡʘ ɢʘ | | ɡǀ ɢǀ | ɡǃ ɢǃ | | ɡ𝼊 ɢ𝼊 | ɡǂ ɢǂ | | |
| Click (top: velar; bottom: uvular) | Nasal | ŋʘ ɴʘ | | ŋǀ ɴǀ | ŋǃ ɴǃ | | ŋ𝼊 ɴ𝼊 | ŋǂ ɴǂ | ʞ | |
| Click (top: velar; bottom: uvular) | Tenuis lateral | | | | kǁ qǁ | | | | | |
| Click (top: velar; bottom: uvular) | Voiced lateral | | | | ɡǁ ɢǁ | | | | | |
| Click (top: velar; bottom: uvular) | Nasal lateral | | | | ŋǁ ɴǁ | | | | | |
