= Front rounded vowel =

Type of vowel sound

IPA: Vowels

	Front	Central	Back
Close	i y	ɨ ʉ	ɯ u
Near-close	ɪ ʏ		ʊ
Close-mid	e ø	ɘ ɵ	ɤ o
Mid	e̞ ø̞	ə	ɤ̞ o̞
Open-mid	ɛ œ	ɜ ɞ	ʌ ɔ
Near-open	æ	ɐ
Open	a ɶ	ä	ɑ ɒ

- IPA help
- audio
- full chart
- template

Legend: unrounded • rounded

A front rounded vowel is a particular type of vowel that is both front and rounded.

The front rounded vowels defined by the IPA include:

- [y], a close front-rounded vowel (or "high front rounded vowel")
- [ʏ], a near-close front rounded vowel (or "near-high ...")
- [ø], a close-mid front rounded vowel (or "high-mid ...")
- [ø̞], a mid front rounded vowel
- [œ], an open-mid front rounded vowel (or "low-mid ...")
- [ɶ], an open front rounded vowel (or "low ...")

Front rounded vowels are cross-linguistically relatively uncommon, but occur in a number of well-known languages, including French, German, Turkish, and Mandarin.

Lip rounding is produced by bringing the corners of the lips together and protruding them forward. This is harder to do while producing low or open vowels since the lips are being stressed vertically. This may explain why low vowels are usually unrounded. Roundedness is usually associated with back vowels. This helps to reinforce the low-pitched formant frequencies associated with back vowels, making them more distinct from their front counterparts.

The high vowel [y] is the most common, while the low vowel [ɶ] is extremely rare. This is consistent with the general correlation between rounding and vowel height.

Front rounded vowels usually occur in languages with vowel systems that distinguish a higher-than-average number of different vowel qualities. Typically, when a front rounded vowel occurs, the inventory of vowels includes an unrounded front vowel and a rounded back vowel of similar height. For example, many languages with [ø], such as Kalmyk, Hungarian, or Turkish, also have [e] and [o]. Because of this, and what is known about many languages with front rounded vowels, front rounded vowels typically reflect a development from a vowel system that previously had fewer members.

== Geographical distribution ==
Most languages with front rounded vowels are found in the more northern parts of Eurasia.

Language families in which front-rounded vowels are common are:

- Some Sino-Tibetan languages:
  - Chinese varieties (e.g. Mandarin including Standard Chinese; Cantonese; Wu Chinese)
  - Standard Tibetan
- Various Indo-European languages:
  - Modern Germanic languages (with the notable exceptions of the largest dialects of Modern English (although [yː] for /uː/ is found in some accents in Northern England, and [øː] is a common South African realization of /ɜː/), Yiddish, and many German dialects)
  - Gallo-Romance languages (except Catalan), a subset of the Romance languages (e.g. French, Occitan, Lombard)
  - Albanian
  - Ancient Greek
- Turkic languages (with the notable exception of standard Uzbek which no longer retains vowel harmony nor phonemic front rounded vowels)
- Mongolic languages (e.g. Kalmyk, Dagur language, Inner Mongolian dialects; but not standard Khalkha)
- Various Uralic languages (e.g. Estonian, Finnish, Hungarian)

== Development ==
Many of the Uralic, Mongolic, and Turkic languages that contain front rounded vowels also have vowel harmony systems, such as rounding or backness harmony. The processes which bring about fronting or roundedness harmony may be important in introducing front rounded vowels into a language's inventory.

Front rounded vowels can also develop independently of vowel harmony. In French, [y] is the result of an older [u] moving forward while remaining rounded. French re-developed [u] by moving [o] upwards. For example, the familiar second-person pronoun tu, pronounced [ty], is spelled the same as its Latin source tu which had a back vowel, and the plural or polite second-person pronoun vous is pronounced with [u], but it derives from Latin vos which had a mid vowel. Some varieties of modern English are similarly fronting [u]. In cases like these the creation of front rounded vowels is independent of adjacent sounds in the word.

In other languages front rounded vowels evolved as previously back vowels became fronted by adjacent segments. For example, in German, back vowels became fronted when followed by high front vowels. The front vowels causing this change were often in inflectional or derivational endings and were then lost or changed into mid vowels. In the different Chinese languages, [y] is often derived from [ut]. The tongue must be moved forward to pronounce the [t], so the [u] can shift forward as well. If the [t] is lost then the change from [ut] to [y] is complete.

Considering the different historical scenarios which can give rise to front rounded vowels, it is notable that they are relatively concentrated in a particular geographical region. It is likely that the presence of front rounded vowels in some languages can facilitate phonetically-motivated processes in other nearby languages.

Place →	Labial					Coronal										Dorsal					Laryngeal			
Manner ↓	Bilabial		Labiodental		Linguolabial		Dental		Alveolar		Postalveolar		Retroflex		Palatal		Velar		Uvular		Pharyngeal/epiglottal		Glottal	
Nasal	m̥	m	ɱ̊	ɱ		n̼			n̥	n			ɳ̊	ɳ	ɲ̊	ɲ	ŋ̊	ŋ	ɴ̥	ɴ				
Plosive	p	b	p̪	b̪	t̼	d̼			t	d			ʈ	ɖ	c	ɟ	k	ɡ	q	ɢ	ʡ		ʔ	
Sibilant affricate									ts	dz	t̠ʃ	d̠ʒ	tʂ	dʐ	tɕ	dʑ								
Non-sibilant affricate	pɸ	bβ	p̪f	b̪v			t̪θ	d̪ð	tɹ̝̊	dɹ̝	t̠ɹ̠̊˔	d̠ɹ̠˔			cç	ɟʝ	kx	ɡɣ	qχ	ɢʁ	ʡʜ	ʡʢ	ʔh	
Sibilant fricative									s	z	ʃ	ʒ	ʂ	ʐ	ɕ	ʑ								
Non-sibilant fricative	ɸ	β	f	v	θ̼	ð̼	θ	ð	θ̠	ð̠	ɹ̠̊˔	ɹ̠˔	ɻ̊˔	ɻ˔	ç	ʝ	x	ɣ	χ	ʁ	ħ	ʕ	h	ɦ
Approximant				ʋ						ɹ				ɻ		j		ɰ						ʔ̞
Tap/flap		ⱱ̟		ⱱ		ɾ̼			ɾ̥	ɾ			ɽ̊	ɽ						ɢ̆		ʡ̆		
Trill	ʙ̥	ʙ							r̥	r			ɽ̊r̥	ɽr					ʀ̥	ʀ	ʜ	ʢ		
Lateral affricate									tɬ	dɮ			tꞎ	d𝼅	c𝼆	ɟʎ̝	k𝼄	ɡʟ̝						
Lateral fricative									ɬ	ɮ			ꞎ	𝼅	𝼆	ʎ̝	𝼄	ʟ̝						
Lateral approximant										l				ɭ		ʎ		ʟ		ʟ̠				
Lateral tap/flap									ɺ̥	ɺ			𝼈̥	𝼈		ʎ̆		ʟ̆						

		BL	LD	D	A	PA	RF	P	V	U	EG
Ejective	Stop	pʼ			tʼ		ʈʼ	cʼ	kʼ	qʼ	ʡʼ
Ejective	Affricate		p̪fʼ	t̪θʼ	tsʼ	t̠ʃʼ	tʂʼ	tɕʼ	kxʼ	qχʼ	
Ejective	Fricative	ɸʼ	fʼ	θʼ	sʼ	ʃʼ	ʂʼ	ɕʼ	xʼ	χʼ	
Ejective	Lateral affricate				tɬʼ			c𝼆ʼ	k𝼄ʼ	q𝼄ʼ	
Ejective	Lateral fricative				ɬʼ						
Click (top: velar; bottom: uvular)	Tenuis	kʘ qʘ		kǀ qǀ	kǃ qǃ		k𝼊 q𝼊	kǂ qǂ			
Click (top: velar; bottom: uvular)	Voiced	ɡʘ ɢʘ		ɡǀ ɢǀ	ɡǃ ɢǃ		ɡ𝼊 ɢ𝼊	ɡǂ ɢǂ			
Click (top: velar; bottom: uvular)	Nasal	ŋʘ ɴʘ		ŋǀ ɴǀ	ŋǃ ɴǃ		ŋ𝼊 ɴ𝼊	ŋǂ ɴǂ	ʞ		
Click (top: velar; bottom: uvular)	Tenuis lateral				kǁ qǁ						
Click (top: velar; bottom: uvular)	Voiced lateral				ɡǁ ɢǁ						
Click (top: velar; bottom: uvular)	Nasal lateral				ŋǁ ɴǁ						
Implosive	Voiced	ɓ			ɗ		ᶑ	ʄ	ɠ	ʛ	
Implosive	Voiceless	ɓ̥			ɗ̥		ᶑ̊	ʄ̊	ɠ̊	ʛ̥	
