= Cardinal vowels =

Reference vowels used to describe the sounds of languages

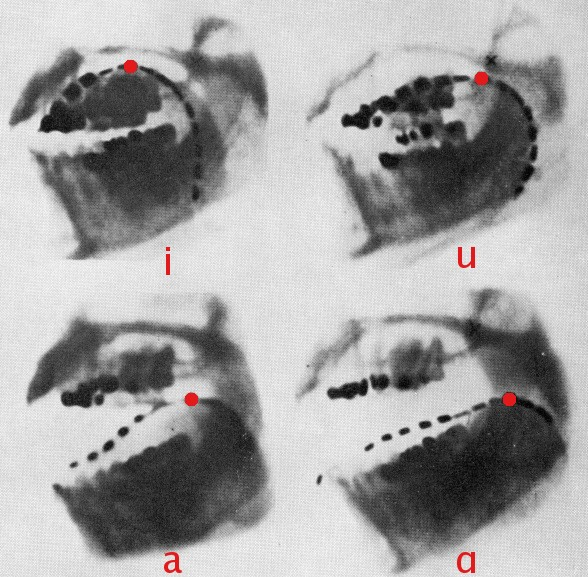
X-rays of Daniel Jones' [i, u, a, ɑ].

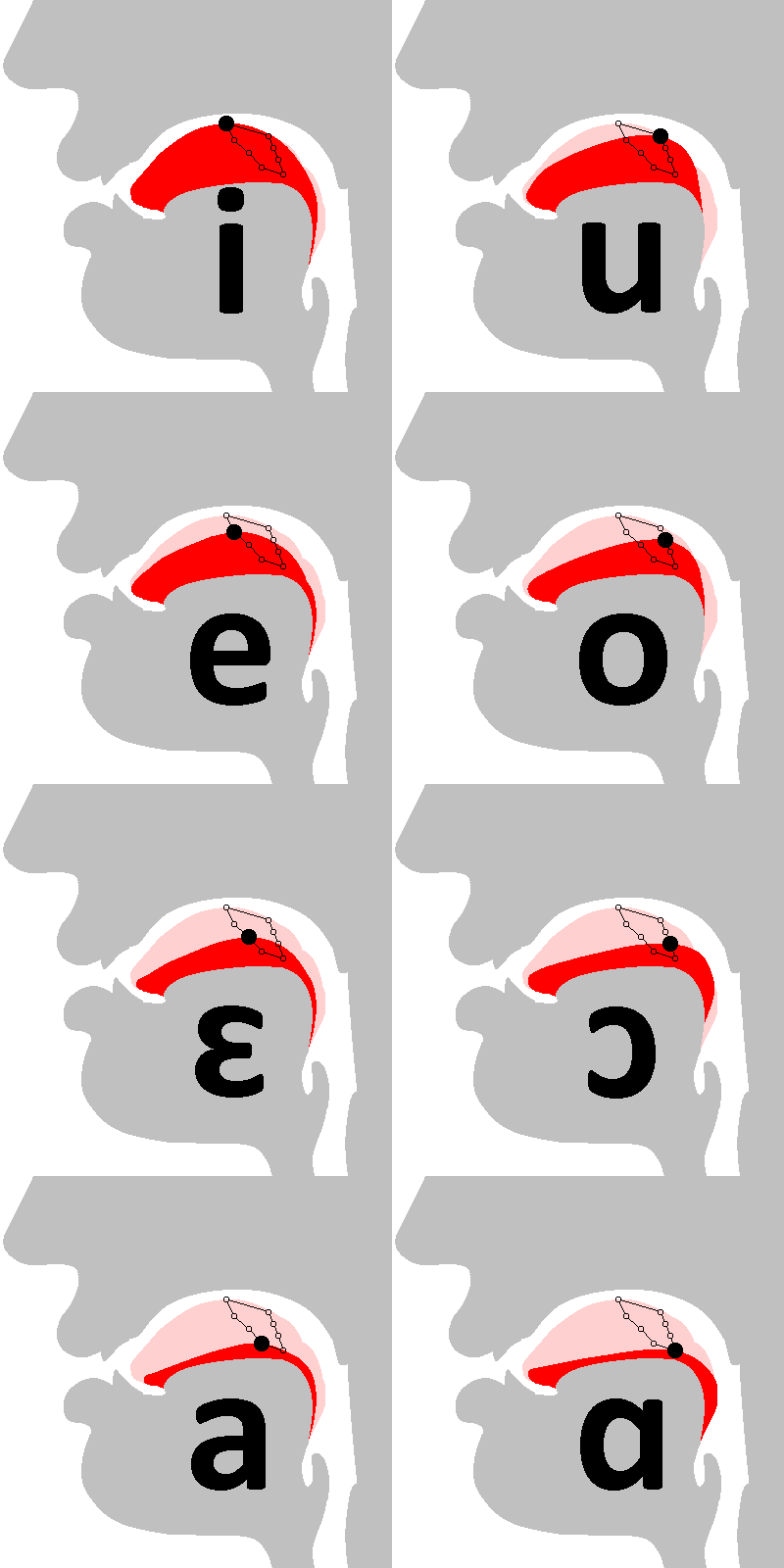
Highest tongue positions of cardinal front and back vowels

Diagram of relative highest points of tongue for cardinal vowels

The cardinal vowel quadrilateral, a more commonly seen schematic diagram of highest tongue positions of cardinal vowels

Cardinal vowels (sometimes abbreviated as CVs) are a set of reference vowels used by phoneticians in describing the sounds of languages. They are classified depending on the position of the tongue relative to the roof of the mouth, how far forward or back is the highest point of the tongue, and the position of the lips (rounded or unrounded).

A cardinal vowel is a vowel sound produced when the tongue is in an extreme position, either front or back, high or low. The current system was formulated by Daniel Jones in the early 20th century, though the idea goes back to earlier phoneticians, notably Alexander John Ellis and Alexander Melville Bell.

== Description ==

=== Definitions ===
Four of the cardinal vowels—[i, a, ɑ, u]—have articulatory definitions as fixed reference points:

- [i] is produced with the tongue as close as possible to the hard palate without producing frication, with spread (unrounded) lips.
- [u] is produced with the tongue as close as possible to the soft palate (velum) without producing frication, with protruded (rounded) lips.
- [ɑ] is produced with tongue as close as possible to the pharynx without producing frication, with neutral (unrounded) lips.
- [a] is produced with the tongue as forward as possible while the mouth is as open as possible (that is, approximately the frontness of [i] combined with the openness of [ɑ]), with neutral (unrounded) lips.

The other vowels are 'auditorily equidistant' between these four 'corner vowels', at four degrees of aperture or 'height': close (high tongue position), close-mid, open-mid, and open (low tongue position).

==== Primary cardinal vowels ====
The four degrees of aperture combined with the front–back distinction define eight reference points on a mixture of articulatory and auditory criteria. These eight vowels are known as the eight 'primary cardinal vowels', and vowels like these are common in the world's languages.

==== Secondary cardinal vowels ====
The lip positions for each of the primary reference points can be reversed with the lip position of the corresponding vowel on the opposite side of the front–back dimension, so that e.g. Cardinal 1 (with unrounded lips) can be produced with rounding somewhat similar to that of Cardinal 8 (with rounded lips, either protruded or compressed), and vice versa. The vowels produced as a result of this reversal are known as 'secondary cardinal vowels'. Sounds such as these are claimed to be less common in the world's languages.

Cardinals 17–22 are also considered secondary, and are defined as 'central', approximately halfway between the front and back dimensions. There are 6 intermediate vowel sounds additionally recognized on the vowel chart of the International Phonetic Alphabet that are not considered cardinals: ⟨ɪ ʏ ʊ ə ɐ æ⟩.

==== Purpose ====
Jones argued that to be able to use the cardinal vowel system effectively, one must undergo training either with an expert phonetician, or otherwise with extensive studying of specially created audio recordings for each vowel, working both on the recognition and the production of the sounds.

Cardinal vowels are not vowels of any particular language, but a measuring system. However, some languages contain vowel or vowels that are close to the cardinal vowel(s). An example of such language is Ngwe, which is spoken in Cameroon. It has been cited as a language with a vowel system that has eight vowels which are rather similar to the eight primary cardinal vowels.

=== Table of cardinal vowels ===
#	IPA	Description
1	[i]	Close front unrounded vowel
2	[e]	Close-mid front unrounded vowel
3	[ɛ]	Open-mid front unrounded vowel
4	[a]	Open front unrounded vowel
5	[ɑ]	Open back unrounded vowel
6	[ɔ]	Open-mid back rounded vowel
7	[o]	Close-mid back rounded vowel
8	[u]	Close back rounded vowel
9	[y]	Close front rounded vowel
10	[ø]	Close-mid front rounded vowel
11	[œ]	Open-mid front rounded vowel
12	[ɶ]	Open front rounded vowel
13	[ɒ]	Open back rounded vowel
14	[ʌ]	Open-mid back unrounded vowel
15	[ɤ]	Close-mid back unrounded vowel
16	[ɯ]	Close back unrounded vowel
17	[ɨ]	Close central unrounded vowel
18	[ʉ]	Close central rounded vowel
19	[ɘ]	Close-mid central unrounded vowel
20	[ɵ]	Close-mid central rounded vowel
21	[ɜ]	Open-mid central unrounded vowel
22	[ɞ]	Open-mid central rounded vowel

Primary cardinal vowels
	Front	Central	Back
Close	^{1}i ·	—N/a	· u^{8}
Close-mid	^{2}e ·	—N/a	· o^{7}
Open-mid	^{3}ɛ ·	—N/a	· ɔ^{6}
Open	^{4}a ·	—N/a	^{5}ɑ ·

Secondary cardinal vowels
	Front	Central	Back
Close	· y^{9}	^{17}ɨ · ʉ^{18}	^{16}ɯ ·
Close-mid	· ø^{10}	^{19}ɘ · ɵ^{20}	^{15}ɤ ·
Open-mid	· œ^{11}	^{21}ɜ · ɞ^{22}	^{14}ʌ ·
Open	· ɶ^{12}	—N/a	· ɒ^{13}

The primary cardinal vowels 1–8 were initially defined in Jones' 1917 English Pronouncing Dictionary, while the secondary cardinal vowels 9–18 were first defined in a 1956 handbook by Jones, with accompanying audio recordings. The letter for Cardinal 12 ⟨ɶ⟩ was added to the IPA in 1976 based on this 1956 definition.

The central secondary cardinal vowels 19–22 were added by David Abercrombie in 1967, and affirmed by J. C. Catford in 1977. The letters for Cardinals 19–22 ⟨ɘ ɵ ɜ ɞ⟩ were added to the IPA in 1993 to reflect these definitions.

The IPA numbers for Cardinals 1–18 are encoded as their number plus 300. For example, the number for Cardinal 8 is 308.

== Limits on the accuracy of the system ==
The usual explanation of the cardinal vowel system implies that the competent user can reliably distinguish between sixteen Primary and Secondary vowels plus a small number of central vowels. The provision of diacritics by the International Phonetic Association further implies that intermediate values may also be reliably recognized, so that a phonetician might be able to produce and recognize not only a close-mid front unrounded vowel [e] and an open-mid front unrounded vowel [ɛ] but also a mid front unrounded vowel [e̞], a centralized mid front unrounded vowel [ë], and so on. This suggests a range of vowels nearer to forty or fifty than to twenty in number. Empirical evidence for this ability in trained phoneticians is hard to come by.

Ladefoged, in a series of pioneering experiments published in the 1950s and 60s, studied how trained phoneticians coped with the vowels of a dialect of Scottish Gaelic. He asked eighteen phoneticians to listen to a recording of ten words spoken by a native speaker of Gaelic and to place the vowels on a cardinal vowel quadrilateral. He then studied the degree of agreement or disagreement among the phoneticians. Ladefoged himself drew attention to the fact that the phoneticians who were trained in the British tradition established by Daniel Jones were closer to each other in their judgments than those who had not had this training. However, the most striking result is the great divergence of judgments among all the listeners regarding vowels that were distant from Cardinal values.

== See also ==
- Index of phonetics articles

== Bibliography ==
- Abercrombie, David (1967). Elements of General Phonetics. Edinburgh University Press. pp. 151–162. ISBN 0-85224-028-7.
- Catford, J. C. (1977). Fundamental Problems in Phonetics. Edinburgh University Press. ISBN 0-85224-279-4.
- Catford, J. C. (1990). "A Proposal Concerning Central Vowels". Journal of the International Phonetic Association. 20 (2): 26–28. JSTOR 44526804.
- Esling, John; Gaylord, Harry (1993). "Computer Codes for Phonetic Symbols". Journal of the International Phonetic Association. 23 (2): 83–97. JSTOR 44526841.
- Esling, John (1995). "News of the IPA: Correction to the IPA Chart". Journal of the International Phonetic Association. 25 (1): 48. JSTOR 44526850.
- Jones, Daniel (1956). Cardinal Vowels Spoken by Daniel Jones: Text of Records with Explanatory Notes by Professor Jones (PDF). London: Linguaphone Institute.
- Ladefoged, Peter (1971). Preliminaries to linguistic phonetics. Chicago: The University of Chicago Press. ISBN 0-22646-786-4.
- Passy, Paul; Jones, Daniel (1921). L’Écriture Phonétique Internationale: Exposé Populaire (2e ed.). Paris: Association Phonétique Internationale.
- Roach, P. J. (1989). "Report on the 1989 Kiel Convention: International Phonetic Association". Journal of the International Phonetic Association. 19 (2): 67–80. JSTOR 44526032.
- Roach, P. J. (1993). "Council Actions on Revisions of the IPA". Journal of the International Phonetic Association. 23 (1): 32–34. JSTOR 44594811.
- Wells, J. C. (1975). "The Association's Alphabet". Journal of the International Phonetic Association. 5 (2): 52–58. JSTOR 44525810.
- Wells, J. C. (1976). "The Association's Alphabet". Journal of the International Phonetic Association. 6 (1): 2–3. JSTOR 44525825.
