= Relative articulation =

Description of producing a sound

In phonetics and phonology, relative articulation is description of the manner and place of articulation of a speech sound relative to some reference point. Typically, the comparison is made with a default, unmarked articulation of the same phoneme in a neutral sound environment. For example, the English velar consonant /k/ is fronted before the vowel /iː/ (as in keep) compared to articulation of /k/ before other vowels (as in cool). This fronting is called palatalization.

The relative position of a sound may be described as advanced (fronted), retracted (backed), raised, lowered, centralized, or mid-centralized. The latter two terms are only used with vowels, and are marked in the International Phonetic Alphabet with diacritics over the vowel letter. The others are used with both consonants and vowels, and are marked with iconic diacritics under the letter. Another dimension of relative articulation that has IPA diacritics is the degree of roundedness, more rounded and less rounded.

== Advanced and retracted ==
Advanced, retracted

◌̟ ◌᫈ ◌˖

◌̠ ◌᫢ ◌˗

An advanced or fronted sound is one that is pronounced farther to the front of the vocal tract than some reference point. The diacritic for this in the IPA is the subscript plus, U+031F ◌̟ COMBINING PLUS SIGN BELOW. Conversely, a retracted or backed sound is one that is pronounced farther to the back of the vocal tract, and its IPA diacritic is the subscript minus U+0320 ◌̠ COMBINING MINUS SIGN BELOW. For letters with descenders, diacritics above or obsolete U+02D6 ˖ MODIFIER LETTER PLUS SIGN and U+02D7 ˗ MODIFIER LETTER MINUS SIGN may instead be used after the letter, as in [ɡ˖] and [y˗].

Both vowels and consonants may be fronted or backed. In verbal description, the prefix pre- may be used to indicate fronting, especially in the terms prepalatal and prevelar. Otherwise phrases like "fronted u" may be used. For retraction, either the prefix post- may be used to indicate retraction, as above, or phrases like "retracted i" may be used.

In most dialects of English, the back vowel /u/ is farther forward than what is normally indicated by the IPA letter ‹u›. This fronting may be shown explicitly, especially within a narrow transcription: [u̟]. Whether this is as far front as the central vowel [ʉ], or somewhere between [u] and [ʉ], may need to be clarified verbally, or on a vowel diagram.

The difference between a fronted and non-fronted consonant can be heard in the English words key [k̟ʰi] and coo [kʰu], where the /k/ in key is fronted under the influence of the front vowel /i/. In English, the plosive in the affricate /tʃ/, as in the word church, is farther back than an alveolar /t/ due to assimilation with the postalveolar fricative /ʃ/. In narrow transcription, /tʃ/ may be transcribed [t̠ʃʰ]. In English, the /d/ in the phrase "I need that" is farther front than normal due to assimilation with the interdental consonant /ð/, and may be transcribed as [aɪ̯ ˈniːd̟ ðæt].

Languages may have phonemes that are farther back than the nearest IPA symbol. For example, Polish sz is a postalveolar sibilant. While this is often transcribed as [ʃ], it is not domed (partially palatalized) the way a prototypical [ʃ] is. A more precise transcription is therefore [s̠]. Similarly, the velar consonants in Kwakiutl are actually postvelar; that is, pronounced farther back than a prototypical velar, between velar [k] and uvular [q], and is thus transcribed [k̠].

Officially, the IPA symbol [a] stands for the open front unrounded vowel. However, in most languages where it is used, [a] actually stands for the central, rather than the front vowel. If precision is desired, this may also be indicated with the minus sign [a̠], although a number of other transcriptions are also possible.

== Raised and lowered ==
Raised and lowered

◌̝ ◌᷵ ◌˔

◌̞ ◌᫛ ◌˕

A raised sound is articulated with the tongue or lip raised higher than some reference point. In the IPA this is indicated with the uptack diacritic U+031D ◌̝ COMBINING UP TACK BELOW.

A lowered sound is articulated with the tongue or lip lowered (the mouth more open) than some reference point. In the IPA this is indicated with the downtack diacritic U+031E ◌̞ COMBINING DOWN TACK BELOW. Both consonants and vowels may be marked as raised or lowered.

When a letter has a descender, the tack may be written above it, or using the obsolete U+02D4 ˔ MODIFIER LETTER UP TACK, as in [ɭ˔], or U+02D5 ˕ MODIFIER LETTER DOWN TACK, as in [ɣ˕].

=== Raised and lowered vowels ===
In the case of a vowel, raising means that the vowel is closer, toward the top of the vowel chart. For example, [e̝] represents a vowel somewhere between cardinal [e] and [i], or may even be [i]. Lowering, on the other hand, means that the vowel is more open, toward the bottom of the chart. For example, [e̞] represents a vowel somewhere between cardinal [e] and [ɛ], or may even be [ɛ].

In other non-IPA transcription systems, raised vowels are indicated with the iconic upward-pointing arrowhead U+02F0 ˰ MODIFIER LETTER LOW UP ARROWHEAD while lowered vowels have the downward arrowhead U+02EF ˯ MODIFIER LETTER LOW DOWN ARROWHEAD. Thus, IPA [e̝] is equivalent to [e˰], IPA [e̞] is equivalent to [e˯].

=== Raised and lowered consonants ===
With consonants, raising and lowering changes the manner of articulation to have more or less stricture. For example, raised approximants and trills are fricatives, whereas lowered fricatives are approximants. The ambiguous symbols for rear approximant/fricatives may be specified as fricatives with the raising diacritic, [ʁ̝, ʕ̝, ʢ̝], or as approximants with the lowering diacritic, [ʁ̞, ʕ̞, ʢ̞]. In Spanish, the lenited allophones of the voiced stops are generally transcribed as fricatives even though they are approximants, or intermediate between fricative and approximant. This may be partially due to the fact there is only a dedicated IPA symbol for one of them, the velar approximant. More precise transcription will use the fricative symbols with the lowering diacritic, [β̞, ð̞, ɣ˕] (the last symbol may be rendered as [ɣ̞], but that may not display properly in some browsers). Czech, on the other hand, requires the opposite: Its fricated trill, which is a separate phoneme, may be transcribed as a raised trill, [r̝]. Similarly, the non-sibilant coronal fricative is written [ɹ̝], and the voiceless velar lateral fricative as [ʟ̝̊]. (A dedicated letter for this sound, ⟨𝼄⟩, is provided by the extIPA and may be used in IPA transcription.)

From most open (least stricture) to most close (most stricture), there are several independent relationships among speech sounds. Open vowel → mid vowel → close vowel → approximant → fricative → plosive is one; flap → stop is another; and trill → trilled fricative yet another. The IPA chart has been organized so that the raising diacritic moves the value of a letter through these series toward the top of the chart, and the lowering diacritic toward the bottom of the chart, but this only works for some of the consonants. While it would be convenient if all consonants could be so ordered, consonants are too diverse for a single dimension to capture their relationships. In addition, many of the points along the series may be nasalized or lateralized as well, and these parameters are independent of stricture.

Examples of stricture series
	Oral	Nasal	Trill	Lateral
Stop / Affricate	ɟ	ɲ	d͡r	t͡ɬ
Fricative	ʝ	ʝ̃	r̝	ɬ
Approximant / Liquid	j	ȷ̃	r	l̥
Close vowel	i	ĩ	(N/A)	
Near-close vowel	e̝	ẽ̝	(N/A)	
Close-mid vowel	e	ẽ	(N/A)	
Mid vowel	e̞	ẽ̞	(N/A)	
Open-mid vowel	ɛ	ɛ̃	(N/A)	
Near-open vowel	æ	æ̃	(N/A)	
Open vowel	a	ã	(N/A)	

== Centralized ==
=== Centralized vowels ===
Centralized

◌̈

A centralized vowel is a vowel that is more central than some point of reference, or that has undergone a shift in this direction. The diacritic for this in the International Phonetic Alphabet is the diaeresis, U+0308 ◌̈ COMBINING DIAERESIS.

For example, to transcribe rounded and unrounded near-close central vowels, the symbols [ɪ̈, ʊ̈] may be used.

In other (non-IPA) transcription systems, ⟨ᵻ, ᵿ⟩ (or ⟨~~ɪ~~, ~~ʊ~~⟩) will be seen instead of [ɪ̈, ʊ̈] (by analogy with [ɨ, ʉ]). Before the letters [ɘ, ɵ, ɜ, ɞ] were added to the IPA in 1993, the symbols [ë, ö, ɛ̈, ɔ̈] were used for these near-schwa values. [ë, ö, ɛ̈, ɔ̈] would now be assumed to represent articulations intermediate between [e, o, ɛ, ɔ] and [ɘ, ɵ, ɜ, ɞ]. Similarly, [ï, ÿ, ü, ɯ̈] would be intermediate between [i, y, u, ɯ] and [ɨ, ʉ].

However, since the IPA does not specify the exact amount of centralization that centralized vowels have, the symbols [ë, ö, ɛ̈, ɔ̈] and [ï, ÿ, ü, ɯ̈] can in modern transcriptions be used at times to transcribe fully central vowels, or vowels that have a variable amount of centralization.

In the majority of languages described as having an [a] (which denotes a front vowel), the vowel is actually central and therefore a more narrow transcription of it is [ä]. However, this symbol is not commonly used mainly because of the common practice of avoiding using diacritics wherever possible, and because very few languages contrast front and central open unrounded vowels.

Instead of the diacritic for centralization, the advanced or retracted diacritics may be used (an equivalent transcription of [ä] is retracted [a̠]), but the concept of centralization is convenient in cases where front and back vowels move toward each other, rather than all advancing or retracting in the same direction.

When a transcription system uses both the centralized and the advanced/retracted diacritics, generally the former indicates a more central vowel, so that e.g. [i̠] indicates an only slightly centralized (retracted) front vowel [i], whereas [ï] indicates a more centralized (retracted) front vowel, or even a fully central vowel [ɨ].

=== Centralized semivowels ===
Semivowels can be centralized much like vowels; for instance, the semivowels corresponding to the close central vowels [ɨ, ʉ] can be written as centralized palatal semivowels [j̈, ɥ̈], or centralized velar semivowels [ɰ̈, ẅ]. The transcription [ɥ̈] vs. [ẅ] may also denote a distinction in the type of rounding, with the former symbol denoting a semivowel with compressed rounding typical of front vowels, and the latter symbol denoting a semivowel with protruded rounding typical of central and back vowels, though an additional verbal clarification is usual in such cases, as the IPA does not provide any official means to distinguish sounds with compressed and protruded rounding.

=== Mid-centralized vowels ===
Mid-centralized

◌̽ ◌͓

Mid-centralized vowels are closer to the midpoint of the vowel space than their referent vowels. That is, they are closer to the mid-central vowel schwa [ə] not just by means of centralization, but also by raising or lowering. The diacritic used to mark this in the International Phonetic Alphabet is the over-cross, U+033D ◌̽ COMBINING X ABOVE. To avoid an ascender, or a diacritic above, the mark may be placed below the letter, as in [ɯ͓̃́].

In most languages, vowels become mid-centralized when spoken quickly, and in some languages, such as English and Russian, many vowels are also mid-centralized when unstressed. This is a general characteristic of vowel reduction.

Mid-centralization of vowels can be a speech impediment. An example from Polish is zobaczyłem dziś dwa samochody [zɔ̽bɐˈt͡ʂɘwɛ̽m ˈd͡ʑɪʑ ˈdvɐ sɐmɔ̽ˈxɔ̽dɘ] ('I saw two cars today'), instead of the standard [zɔbäˈt͡ʂɘwɛm ˈd͡ʑiʑ ˈdvä sämɔˈxɔdɘ]. This can severely affect intelligibility.

== More and less rounded ==
More or less rounded

◌̹ ◌͗ ◌˒

◌̜ ◌͑ ◌˓

There are also diacritics, respectively U+0339 ◌̹ COMBINING RIGHT HALF RING BELOW and U+031C ◌̜ COMBINING LEFT HALF RING BELOW, to indicate greater or lesser degrees of rounding. For example, the English /ʊ/ often has very little rounding, and may be transcribed [ʊ̜]. In Assamese, on the other hand, the open back rounded vowel is much more rounded than is typical for a low vowel, and may be transcribed [ɒ̹].

These diacritics are sometimes also used with consonants to indicate degrees of labialization. For example, in the Athabaskan language Hupa, voiceless velar fricatives distinguish three degrees of labialization, transcribed either [x x̹ xʷ] or [x x̜ʷ xʷ].

The Extensions to the IPA have two additional symbols for degrees of rounding: spread, as in [i͍], and open-rounded ⟨ꟹ⟩ (^{œ}), as in English [ʃꟹ] and [ʒꟹ].

== Sound changes ==
Many sound changes involve changes in place of articulation:

- raising (phonology)
  - imāla (/a/ raising in Arabic)
  - iotacism (vowel raising and partly fronting in Greek)
- fronting (phonology)
  - i-mutation (vowel fronting or raising, triggered by [i] or [j])

== Bibliography ==
- Clark, John; Yallop, Collin; Fletcher, Janet (2007), Introduction to Phonetics and Phonology, Oxford: Blackwell, pp. 22–26, 264–266
- Cruttenden, Alan (2014), Gimson's Pronunciation of English (8th ed.), Routledge, ISBN 9781444183092
- Wierzchowska, Bożena (1971), Wymowa polska (in Polish), Warsaw: PZWS

Place →	Labial					Coronal										Dorsal					Laryngeal			
Manner ↓	Bilabial		Labiodental		Linguolabial		Dental		Alveolar		Postalveolar		Retroflex		(Alveolo-)palatal		Velar		Uvular		Pharyngeal/epiglottal		Glottal	
Nasal	m̥	m	ɱ̊	ɱ		n̼	n̪̊	n̪	n̥	n	n̠̊	n̠	ɳ̊	ɳ	ɲ̊	ɲ	ŋ̊	ŋ	ɴ̥	ɴ				
Plosive	p	b	p̪	b̪	t̼	d̼	t̪	d̪	t	d			ʈ	ɖ	c	ɟ	k	ɡ	q	ɢ	ʡ		ʔ	
Sibilant affricate							t̪s̪	d̪z̪	ts	dz	t̠ʃ	d̠ʒ	tʂ	dʐ	tɕ	dʑ								
Non-sibilant affricate	pɸ	bβ	p̪f	b̪v			t̪θ	d̪ð	tɹ̝̊	dɹ̝	t̠ɹ̠̊˔	d̠ɹ̠˔			cç	ɟʝ	kx	ɡɣ	qχ	ɢʁ	ʡʜ	ʡʢ	ʔh	
Sibilant fricative							s̪	z̪	s	z	ʃ	ʒ	ʂ	ʐ	ɕ	ʑ								
Non-sibilant fricative	ɸ	β	f	v	θ̼	ð̼	θ	ð	θ̠	ð̠	ɹ̠̊˔	ɹ̠˔	ɻ̊˔	ɻ˔	ç	ʝ	x	ɣ	χ	ʁ	ħ	ʕ	h	ɦ
Approximant		β̞		ʋ				ð̞		ɹ		ɹ̠		ɻ		j		ɰ						˷
Tap/flap		ⱱ̟		ⱱ					ɾ̥	ɾ			ɽ̊	ɽ						ɢ̆		ʡ̆		
Trill	ʙ̥	ʙ							r̥	r		r̠	ɽ̊r̥	ɽr					ʀ̥	ʀ	ʜ	ʢ		
Lateral affricate									tɬ	dɮ			tꞎ	d𝼅	c𝼆	ɟʎ̝	k𝼄	ɡʟ̝						
Lateral fricative							ɬ̪		ɬ	ɮ			ꞎ	𝼅	𝼆	ʎ̝	𝼄	ʟ̝						
Lateral approximant								l̪	l̥	l		l̠	ɭ̊	ɭ	ʎ̥	ʎ	ʟ̥	ʟ		ʟ̠				
Lateral tap/flap									ɺ̥	ɺ			𝼈̊	𝼈		ʎ̆		ʟ̆						

		BL	LD	D	A	PA	RF	P	V	U
Implosive	Voiced	ɓ			ɗ		ᶑ	ʄ	ɠ	ʛ
Implosive	Voiceless	ɓ̥			ɗ̥		ᶑ̊	ʄ̊	ɠ̊	ʛ̥
Ejective	Stop	pʼ			tʼ		ʈʼ	cʼ	kʼ	qʼ
Ejective	Affricate		p̪fʼ	t̪θʼ	tsʼ	t̠ʃʼ	tʂʼ	tɕʼ	kxʼ	qχʼ
Ejective	Fricative	ɸʼ	fʼ	θʼ	sʼ	ʃʼ	ʂʼ	ɕʼ	xʼ	χʼ
Ejective	Lateral affricate				tɬʼ			c𝼆ʼ	k𝼄ʼ	q𝼄ʼ
Ejective	Lateral fricative				ɬʼ					
Click (top: velar; bottom: uvular)	Tenuis	kʘ qʘ		kǀ qǀ	kǃ qǃ		k𝼊 q𝼊	kǂ qǂ		
Click (top: velar; bottom: uvular)	Voiced	ɡʘ ɢʘ		ɡǀ ɢǀ	ɡǃ ɢǃ		ɡ𝼊 ɢ𝼊	ɡǂ ɢǂ		
Click (top: velar; bottom: uvular)	Nasal	ŋʘ ɴʘ		ŋǀ ɴǀ	ŋǃ ɴǃ		ŋ𝼊 ɴ𝼊	ŋǂ ɴǂ	ʞ	
Click (top: velar; bottom: uvular)	Tenuis lateral				kǁ qǁ					
Click (top: velar; bottom: uvular)	Voiced lateral				ɡǁ ɢǁ					
Click (top: velar; bottom: uvular)	Nasal lateral				ŋǁ ɴǁ					
