= Chemnitz dialect =

Upper Saxon dialect of Germany

- Native to: Germany
- Region: Chemnitz
- Language family: Indo-European: Germanic; West Germanic; High German; Central German; East Central German; Upper Saxon German; Vorerzgebirgisch; Chemnitz dialect

Language codes
- ISO 639-3: –
- Glottolog: None

The Chemnitz dialect is a distinct German dialect of the city of Chemnitz and an urban variety of Vorerzgebirgisch, a variant of Upper Saxon German.

== Phonology ==
=== Consonants ===
Consonant phonemes
		Labial	Dental	Postalveolar	Dorsal	Glottal
Nasal		m	n		ŋ	
Plosive	fortis				kʰ	
Plosive	lenis	p	t		k	
Fricative		f	s	ʃ	χ	h
Approximant		ʋ			j	
Liquid			l		ʁ	

- /m, p/ are bilabial, whereas /f, ʋ/ are labiodental.
- /n, t, l, s/ are dental [n̪, t̪, l̪, s̪].
  - /t/ is alveolar [t͇] after /ʃ/.
- /ŋ, kʰ, k/ are velar, /χ, ʁ/ are uvular, and /j/ is palatal. /χ–ʁ/ do not constitute a voiceless–voiced pair.
  - The /kʰ–k/ contrast is restricted to the word-initial position. In many cases, it corresponds to the /k–ɡ/ contrast in Standard German.
  - /ʁ/ occurs only in onsets, and it has a few possible pronunciations, which are in free variation with one another:
    - Voiced uvular approximant [ʁ̞];
    - Voiced [ʁ] or voiceless [ʁ̥] lenis uvular fricative;
    - Voiceless uvular trill [ʀ̥];
    - Voiceless lenis uvular stop [q].
- /p, t, k, f, s, ʃ, χ/ may be voiced between sonorants.
  - Word-final /p, t, k/ are sometimes voiced to [b, d, ɡ].
  - Word-initially, the /t–k/ contrast is neutralized before /l/, which means that e.g. the word Kleid ('dress') can be pronounced as either [tleːt] or [kleːt].
- When a stop or fricative precedes, the sequences /əm, ən, əŋ, əl/ can be realized as syllabic consonants [m̩, n̩, ŋ̍, l̩]. The nasals appear depending on the place of articulation of the preceding consonant, so that it can be bilabial [m̩], dental [n̩], velar [ŋ̍] or uvular [ɴ̩].
- When another nasal precedes a syllabic nasal, such sequence is realized as a single consonant of variable length.
- Non-phonemic glottal stop [ʔ] is inserted in two cases:
  - Before word-initial vowels, even the unstressed ones.
  - Before stressed syllable-initial vowels within words.

=== Vowels ===
Monophthongs of the Chemnitz dialect, from Khan & Weise (2013:236–237). Red vowels are pharyngealized.

Plain
	[-back]		[+back]	
	short	long	short	long
Close	ɪ	iː	ɵ	ʉː
Close-mid		eː		ɵː
Open-mid	ɛ	ɛː	ɞ	
Open			ʌ	ʌː

Pharyngealized
	Unrounded	Rounded	
	Unrounded	short	long
Close			ʊˤː
Close-mid		oˤ	oˤː
Open-mid	ʌˤː		ɔˤː
Open	aˤː		

Non-native
	Short	Long
Close	ʏ	yː
Close-mid		øː
Open-mid	œ	

- The pharyngealized vowels correspond to the sequences of vowel + /r/ in the standard language.
- The non-native vowels are occasionally used in cognates of some Standard German words, such as brüder [ˈpʁyːtoˤ] ('brothers'). In other cases, they are pronounced the same as /ɪ, iː, ɛ, eː/.
- Unstressed short oral monophthongs may fall together as [ə].
- /ʊˤː, oˤː, ʌˤː, ɔˤː, aˤː/ are often diphthongal [ʊːɒ̯ˤ, oːɒ̯ˤ, ɪːɒ̯ˤ, ɔːɒ̯ˤ, ɛːɒ̯ˤ] in careful speech. Monophthongal realizations are optionally shortened in certain positions.
- /oˤ/ corresponds to Standard German [ɐ].
- Monophthongs are somewhat retracted when they precede dorsals, except /j/. The retraction is strongest before /χ, ʁ/. To a certain extent, this is also true of monophthongs that follow dorsal consonants.
- Monophthongs are allophonically pharyngealized if a vowel in the following syllable is pharyngealized.
- The phonetic quality of the monophthongs is as follows:
  - /iː, ʉː, ɵ, ɵː, ʊˤː/ are close to the canonical values of the corresponding IPA symbols [iː, ʉː, ɵ, ɵː, ʊˤː].
  - /ɪ/ is close-mid [ɪ̞].
  - /eː, ɛ, ɛː, oˤ, oˤː, ɔˤː/ are more central than the canonical values of the corresponding IPA symbols: [ëː, ɛ̈, ɛ̈ː, öˤ, öˤː, ɔ̈ˤː].
  - /ɞ/ is mid [ɞ̝].
  - /ʌˤː/ is mid near-back [ʌ̝̈ˤː].
  - /ʌ, ʌː/ are central [ɜ, ɜː].
  - /aˤː/ is near-open near-front [ä̝ˤː].

Diphthongs of the Chemnitz dialect, from Khan & Weise (2013:237).

Diphthong phonemes
	Ending point	
	unrounded	rounded
Mid		ɞʏ
Open	ae	aɵ

- The starting point of /ɞʏ/ is higher and more front than the canonical value of the corresponding IPA symbol ([ɞ̝˖]).
- The starting points of /ae/ and /aɵ/ are higher and more central than the canonical value of the corresponding IPA symbol ([ä̝]).
- The ending points of Chemnitz German diphthongs are close to the canonical values of the corresponding IPA symbols ([ʏ, e, ɵ]).

=== Sample ===
The sample text is a reading of the first sentence of The North Wind and the Sun.

==== Broad phonetic transcription ====
[ˈeːnəs ˈtʌːχəs hʌmʃ toˤ ˈnoˤːtʋɪnt ɵnt tə ˈsɞnə kəˈtsʌŋt | ʋaˤː fɞn ˈpeːtn̩ tɛn nʉː toˤ ˈʃtaˤːkʁə ɪs | ɛls ə ˈʋʌntʁoˤ mɪt nəm ˈʋɔˤːmən ˈmʌntl̩ ʌn | foˤˈpeːkʰʌːm]

==== Orthographic version (standard German) ====
Eines Tages haben sich der Nordwind und die Sonne gezankt, wer von den beiden denn nun der Stärkere ist, als ein Wanderer mit einem warmen Mantel an, vorbeikam.

== Bibliography ==
- Khan, Sameer ud Dowla; Weise, Constanze (2013), "Upper Saxon (Chemnitz dialect)" (PDF), Journal of the International Phonetic Association, 43 (2): 231–241, doi:10.1017/S0025100313000145
