= Vorerzgebirgisch =

Upper Saxon German variety of Germany

- Pronunciation: Standard German: [foːɐ̯ˈʔeːɐ̯tsɡəˌbɪʁɡɪʃ] Vorerzgebirgisch: [foˤːˈʔaˤːtsɡ̊əˌb̥ʌˤːʃ]
- Native to: Germany
- Language family: Indo-European: Germanic; West Germanic; High German; Central German; East Central German; Upper Saxon German; Vorerzgebirgisch

Language codes
- ISO 639-3: –
- Glottolog: None

Vorerzgebirgisch is a variety of Upper Saxon German. It is a transitional dialect between Meißnisch, Vogtländisch and Erzgebirgisch. An example of an urban variety of Vorerzgebirgisch is the Chemnitz dialect.

== Bibliography ==
- Khan, Sameer ud Dowla; Weise, Constanze (2013), "Upper Saxon (Chemnitz dialect)" (PDF), Journal of the International Phonetic Association, 43 (2): 231–241, doi:10.1017/S0025100313000145
