= Retracted vowel =

Vowel sound with tongue pulled into the pharynx

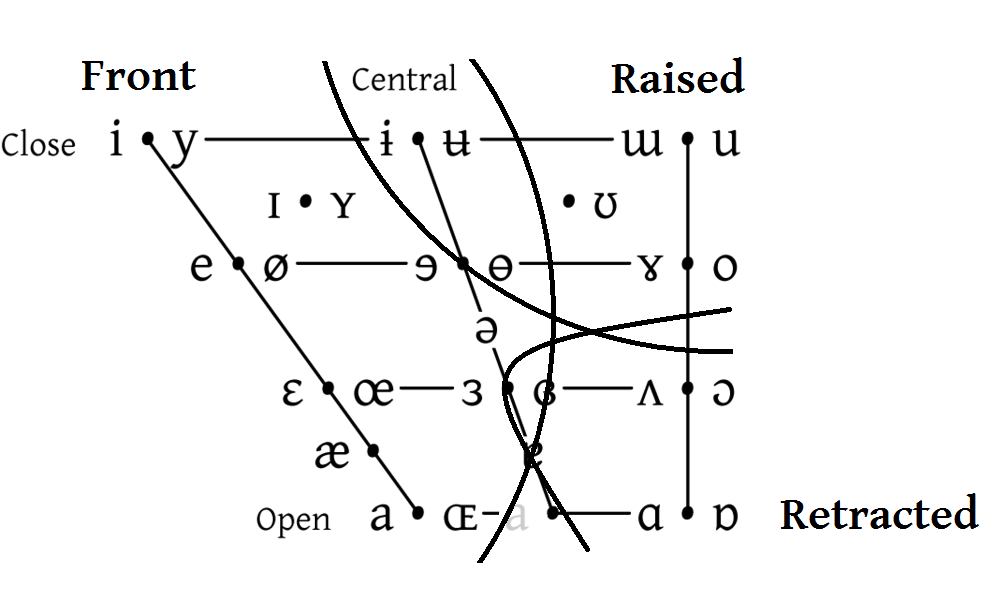
Retracted vowels are one of three articulatory dimensions of vowel space

A retracted vowel is a vowel sound in which the body or root of the tongue is pulled backward and downward into the pharynx. The most retracted cardinal vowels are [ɑ ɒ], which are so far back that the epiglottis may press against the back pharyngeal wall, and [ʌ ɔ]. Raised or front vowels may be partially retracted, for example by an adjacent uvular consonant or by vowel harmony based on retracted tongue root. In both cases, /i y e ø a o u/, for example, may be retracted to [ɪ ʏ ɛ œ ɑ ɔ ʊ̙].

Retracted vowels and raised vowels constitute the traditional, but articulatorily inaccurate, category of back vowels; they may also overlap many of the central vowels.
