= Vowel =

Sound in spoken language, articulated with an open vocal tract

IPA: Vowels

	Front	Central	Back
Close	i y	ɨ ʉ	ɯ u
Near-close	ɪ ʏ		ʊ
Close-mid	e ø	ɘ ɵ	ɤ o
Mid	e̞ ø̞	ə	ɤ̞ o̞
Open-mid	ɛ œ	ɜ ɞ	ʌ ɔ
Near-open	æ	ɐ
Open	a ɶ	ä	ɑ ɒ

- IPA help
- audio
- full chart
- template

Legend: unrounded • rounded

A vowel is a speech sound pronounced with minimal to no stricture in the vocal tract. Vowels are one of the two principal classes of speech sounds, the other being the consonant. Vowels vary in quality, loudness, and length. They are usually voiced and are closely involved in prosodic variation such as tone, intonation and stress. The nucleus, or "center", of a syllable typically consists of a vowel sound (though this is not always the case).

The word vowel comes from the Latin word vocalis, meaning "vocal" (i.e. relating to the voice). In English, the word vowel is commonly used to refer both to vowel sounds and to the written symbols that represent them: ⟨a⟩, ⟨e⟩, ⟨i⟩, ⟨o⟩, ⟨u⟩, and sometimes ⟨y⟩ and ⟨w⟩.

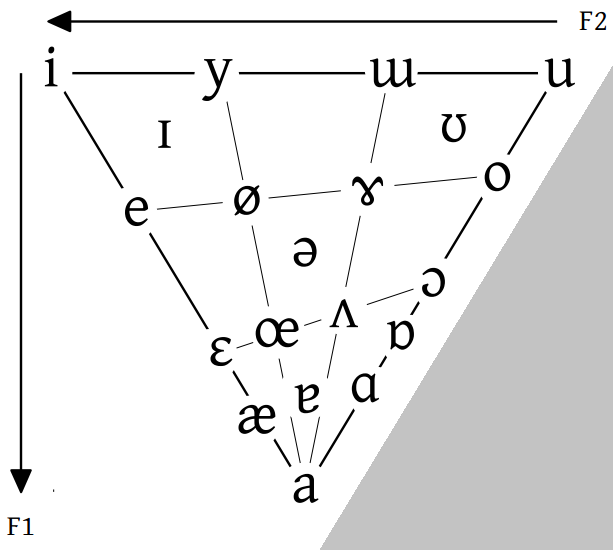
An idealized schematic of vowel space, based on the formants of Daniel Jones and John Wells pronouncing the cardinal vowels of the IPA. The scale is logarithmic. The grey range is where F2 would be less than F1, which by definition is impossible. [a] is an extra-low central vowel. Phonemically it may be front or back, depending on the language. Rounded vowels that are front in tongue position are front-central in formant space, while unrounded vowels that are back in articulation are back-central in formant space. Thus [y ɯ] have perhaps similar F1 and F2 values to the high central vowels [ɨ ʉ], being distinguished by rounding (F3); similarly [ø ɤ] vs central [ɘ ɵ] and [œ ʌ] vs central [ɜ ɞ].

== Definition ==
There are two complementary definitions of vowel, one phonetic and the other phonological.

- In the phonetic definition, a vowel is a sound, such as the English "ah" /ɑː/ or "oh" /oʊ/, produced with an open vocal tract; it is median (the air escapes along the middle of the tongue), oral (at least some of the airflow must escape through the mouth), frictionless and continuant. There is no significant build-up of air pressure at any point above the glottis. This contrasts with consonants, such as the English "sh" [ʃ], which have a constriction or closure at some point along the vocal tract.
- In the phonological definition, a vowel is defined as syllabic, the sound that forms the peak of a syllable. A phonetically equivalent but non-syllabic sound is a semivowel. In oral languages, phonetic vowels normally form the peak (nucleus) of many or all syllables, whereas consonants form the onset and (in languages that have them) coda. Some languages allow other sounds to form the nucleus of a syllable, such as the syllabic (i.e., vocalic) l in the English word table [ˈtʰeɪ.bl̩] (when not considered to have a weak vowel sound: [ˈtʰeɪ.bəl]) or the syllabic r in the Serbo-Croatian word vrt [ʋr̩̂t] "garden".

The phonetic definition of "vowel" (i.e. a sound produced with no constriction in the vocal tract) does not always match the phonological definition (i.e. a sound that forms the peak of a syllable). The approximants [j] and [w] illustrate this: both are without much of a constriction in the vocal tract (so phonetically they seem to be vowel-like), but they occur at the onset of syllables (e.g. in "yet" and "wet") which suggests that phonologically they are consonants. A similar debate arises over whether a word like bird in a rhotic dialect has an r-colored vowel /ɝ/ or a syllabic consonant /ɹ̩/. The American linguist Kenneth Pike (1943) suggested the terms "vocoid" for a phonetic vowel and "vowel" for a phonological vowel; under this terminology, semivowels [j] and [w] are classified as vocoids but not vowels. However, Maddieson and Emmory (1985) demonstrated from a range of languages that semivowels are produced with a narrower constriction of the vocal tract than vowels, and so may be considered consonants on that basis.

== Articulation ==
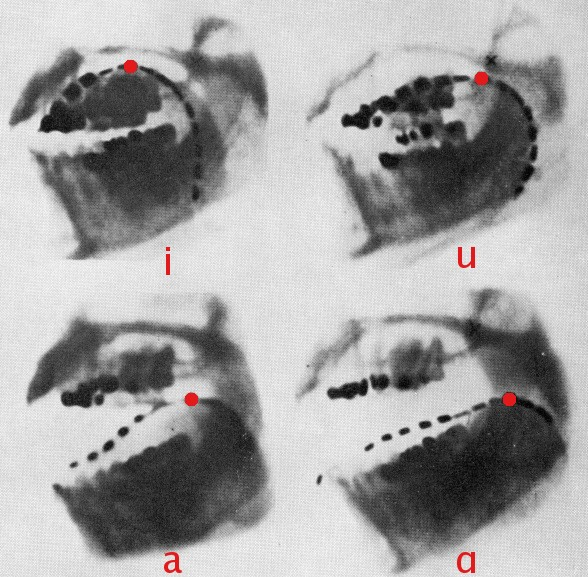
X-rays of Daniel Jones' [i, u, a, ɑ]

The original vowel quadrilateral, from Jones' articulation. The vowel trapezoid of the modern IPA, and at the top of this article, is a simplified rendition of this diagram. The bullets are the cardinal vowel points. (A parallel diagram covers the front and central rounded and back unrounded vowels.) The cells indicate the ranges of articulation that could reasonably be transcribed with those cardinal vowel letters, [i, e, ɛ, a, ɑ, ɔ, o, u, ɨ], and non-cardinal [ə]. If a language distinguishes fewer than these vowel qualities, [e, ɛ] could be merged to ⟨e⟩, [o, ɔ] to ⟨o⟩, [a, ɑ] to ⟨a⟩, etc. If a language distinguishes more, ⟨ɪ⟩ could be added where the ranges of [i, e, ɨ, ə] intersect, ⟨ʊ⟩ where [u, o, ɨ, ə] intersect, and ⟨ɐ⟩ where [ɛ, ɔ, a, ɑ, ə] intersect.

The traditional view of vowel production, reflected for example in the terminology and presentation of the International Phonetic Alphabet, is one of articulatory features that determine a vowel's quality as distinguishing it from other vowels. Daniel Jones developed the cardinal vowel system to describe vowels in terms of the features of tongue height (vertical dimension), tongue backness (horizontal dimension) and roundedness (lip articulation). These three parameters are indicated in the schematic quadrilateral IPA vowel diagram on the right. There are additional features of vowel quality, such as the velum position (nasality), type of vocal fold vibration (phonation), and tongue root position.

This conception of purely articulation-based typology of vowels has been known to be inaccurate since 1928. Peter Ladefoged said that "early phoneticians [...] thought they were describing the highest point of the tongue, but they were not. They were actually describing formant frequencies." (See § Acoustics below.)

In the IPA Handbook, the vowels [i u a ɑ] are regarded as fixed articulatory reference points, with precise tongue positioning, while the remaining vowels are defined "so that the differences between each vowel and the next in the series are auditorily equal". As such, the Handbook concedes:

The use of auditory spacing in the definition of these vowels means vowel description is not based purely on articulation, and is one reason why the vowel quadrilateral must be regarded as an abstraction and not a direct mapping of tongue position.

Nonetheless, the concept that vowel qualities are determined primarily by tongue position and lip rounding continues to be used in pedagogy, as it provides an intuitive explanation of how vowels are distinguished.

=== Height ===
Theoretically, according to the traditional models, vowel height refers to the vertical position of either the tongue or the jaw (depending on the model), relative to either the roof of the mouth or the aperture of the jaw. There are two terms commonly applied to refer to two degrees of vowel height: in close vowels, also known as high vowels, such as [i] and [u], the tongue is positioned close to the palate (i.e. high in the mouth), whereas in open vowels, also known as low vowels, such as [a], the jaw is open and the tongue is positioned low in the mouth. (Note: According to Peter Ladefoged, traditional articulatory descriptions such as height and backness "are not entirely satisfactory", and when phoneticians describe a vowel as high or low, they are in fact describing an acoustic quality rather than the actual position of the tongue.) In John Esling's usage, where fronted vowels are distinguished in height by the position of the jaw rather than the tongue, only the terms 'open' and 'close' are used, as 'high' and 'low' refer to the position of the tongue.

The International Phonetic Alphabet defines letters for six degrees of vowel height for full vowels (plus the reduced mid vowel [ə]), but it is extremely unusual for a language to distinguish this many degrees without other attributes. The IPA letters distinguish (sorted according to height, with the top-most one being the highest and the bottom-most being the lowest):

- close (a.k.a. high): [i y ɨ ʉ ɯ u]
- near-close (a.k.a. near-high): [ɪ ʏ ʊ]
- close-mid (a.k.a. high-mid): [e ø ɘ ɵ ɤ o]
- mid: [ə]
- open-mid (a.k.a. low-mid): [ɛ œ ɜ ɞ ʌ ɔ]
- near-open (a.k.a. near-low): [æ ɐ]
- open (a.k.a. low): [a ɶ ɑ ɒ]

The letters ⟨e, ø, ɘ, ɵ, ɤ, o⟩ are defined as close-mid but are commonly used for true mid vowels. If more precision is required, true mid vowels may be written with a lowering or raising diacritic: ⟨e̞, ɘ̞, ø̞, ɵ̞, ɤ̞, o̞⟩ or ⟨ɛ̝ œ̝ ɜ̝ ɞ̝ ʌ̝ ɔ̝⟩.

The Kensiu language, spoken in Malaysia and Thailand, is highly unusual in contrasting true mid vowels with both close-mid and open-mid vowels, without any additional parameters such as length, roundness or ATR. The front vowels, /i ɪ e e̞ ɛ/, along with open /a/, make a six-way height distinction; this holds even for the nasal vowels. A few varieties of German have been reported to have five contrastive vowel heights that are independent of length or other parameters. For example, the Bavarian dialect of Amstetten has thirteen long vowels, which have been analyzed as four vowel heights (close, close-mid, mid, open-mid) each among the front unrounded, front rounded, and back rounded vowels, along with an open vowel for a fifth height: /i e ɛ̝ ɛ/, /y ø œ̝ œ/, /u o ɔ̝ ɔ/, /a/. Apart from the aforementioned Kensiu language, no other language is known to contrast more than four degrees of vowel height.

The parameter of vowel height appears to be the primary cross-linguistic feature of vowels in that all spoken languages that have been researched till now use height as a contrastive feature. No other parameter, even backness or rounding (see the two immediate sections below), is used in all languages. Some languages have vertical vowel systems in which at least at a phonemic level, only height is used to distinguish vowels.

=== Backness ===
Idealistic tongue positions of cardinal front vowels with highest point indicated

Within the traditional models, vowel backness is named for the horizontal position of the tongue during the articulation of a vowel, relative to the back of the mouth. In front vowels, such as [i], the position of the tongue is more forward in the mouth, whereas in back vowels, such as [u], the tongue is positioned towards the back of the mouth.

The International Phonetic Alphabet defines five degrees of vowel backness (sorted according to backness, with the top-most one being the front-most back and the bottom-most being the back-most):

- front: [i y e ø ɛ œ æ a ɶ]
- near-front: [ɪ ʏ]
- central [ɨ ʉ ɘ ɵ ə ɜ ɞ ɐ]
- near-back: [ʊ]
- back: [ɯ u ɤ o ʌ ɔ ɑ ɒ]

To them may be added front-central and back-central, corresponding to the vertical lines separating central from front and back vowel spaces in several IPA diagrams. However, front-central and back-central may also be used as terms synonymous with near-front and near-back. No language is known to contrast more than three degrees of backness independent of height, nor is there a language that contrasts front with near-front vowels nor back with near-back ones. Although some English dialects have vowels at five degrees of backness, there is no known language that distinguishes five degrees of backness without additional differences in height or rounding.

=== Roundedness ===
Roundedness is named after the rounding of the lips in some vowels. Because lip rounding is easily visible, vowels may be commonly identified as rounded based on the articulation of the lips.

In most languages, roundedness is a reinforcing feature of mid to high back vowels rather than a distinctive feature. Usually, the higher a back vowel, the more intense is the rounding. However, in some languages, roundedness is independent from backness, such as French and German (with front rounded vowels), most Uralic languages (Estonian has a rounding contrast for /o/ and front vowels), Turkic languages (with a rounding distinction for front vowels and /u/), and Vietnamese with back unrounded vowels.

Nonetheless, even in those languages there is usually some phonetic correlation between rounding and backness: front rounded vowels tend to be more front-central than front, and back unrounded vowels tend to be more back-central than back. Thus, the placement of unrounded vowels to the left of rounded vowels on the IPA vowel chart is reflective of their position in formant space.

Different kinds of labialization are possible. In mid to high rounded back vowels the lips are generally protruded ("pursed") outward, a phenomenon known as endolabial rounding because the insides of the lips are visible, whereas in mid to high rounded front vowels the lips are generally "compressed" with the margins of the lips pulled in and drawn towards each other, a phenomenon known as exolabial rounding. However, not all languages follow that pattern. Japanese /u/, for example, is an exolabial (compressed) back vowel, and sounds quite different from an English endolabial /u/. Swedish and Norwegian are the only two known languages in which the feature is contrastive; they have both exo- and endo-labial close front vowels and close central vowels, respectively. In many phonetic treatments, both are considered types of rounding, but some phoneticians do not believe that these are subsets of a single phenomenon and posit instead three independent features of rounded (endolabial), compressed (exolabial), and unrounded. The lip position of unrounded vowels may also be classified separately as spread and neutral (neither rounded nor spread). Others distinguish compressed rounded vowels, in which the corners of the mouth are drawn together, from compressed unrounded vowels, in which the lips are compressed but the corners remain apart as in spread vowels.

=== Front, raised and retracted ===
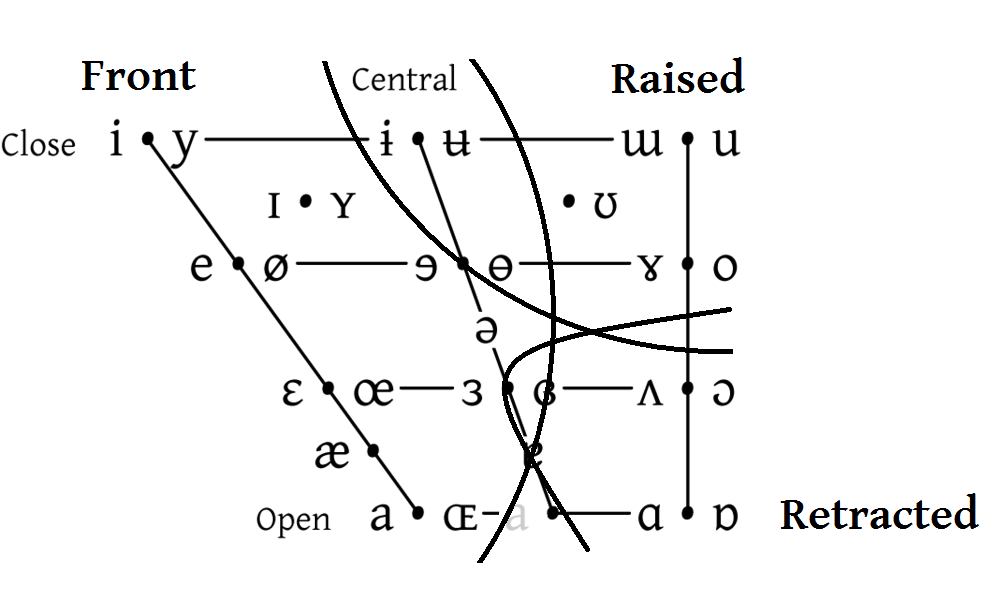
Front, raised and retracted are the three articulatory dimensions of vowel space. Open and close refer to the jaw, not the tongue.

The conception of the tongue moving in two directions, high–low and front–back, is not supported by articulatory evidence and does not clarify how articulation affects vowel quality. Vowels may instead be characterized by the three directions of movement of the tongue from its neutral position: front (forward), raised (upward and back), and retracted (downward and back). Front vowels ([i, e, ɛ] and, to a lesser extent [ɨ, ɘ, ɜ, æ], etc.), can be secondarily qualified as close or open, as in the traditional conception, but this refers to jaw rather than tongue position. In addition, rather than there being a unitary category of back vowels, the regrouping posits raised vowels, where the body of the tongue approaches the velum ([u, o, ɨ], etc.), and retracted vowels, where the root of the tongue approaches the pharynx ([ɑ, ɔ], etc.):

- front
- raised
- retracted

Membership in these categories is scalar, with the mid-central vowels being marginal to any category.

=== Nasalization ===
Nasalization occurs when air escapes through the nose. Vowels are often nasalized under the influence of neighbouring nasal consonants, as in English hand [hæ̃nd]. Nasalized vowels, however, should not be confused with nasal vowels. The latter refers to vowels that are distinct from their oral counterparts, as in French /ɑ/ vs. /ɑ̃/.

In nasal vowels, the velum is lowered, and some air travels through the nasal cavity as well as the mouth. An oral vowel is a vowel in which all air escapes through the mouth. Polish and Portuguese also contrast nasal and oral vowels.

=== Phonation ===
Voicing describes whether the vocal cords are vibrating during the articulation of a vowel. Most languages have only voiced vowels, but several Native American languages, such as Cheyenne and Totonac, have both voiced and devoiced vowels in complementary distribution. Vowels are devoiced in whispered speech. In Japanese and in Quebec French, vowels that are between voiceless consonants are often devoiced. Keres is disputed to have phonemic voiceless vowels but no language is confirmed to have them phonemically.

Modal voice, creaky voice, and breathy voice (murmured vowels) are phonation types that are used contrastively in some languages. Often, they co-occur with tone or stress distinctions; in the Mon language, vowels pronounced in the high tone are also produced with creaky voice. In such cases, it can be unclear whether it is the tone, the voicing type, or the pairing of the two that is being used for phonemic contrast. The combination of phonetic cues (phonation, tone, stress) is known as register or register complex.

=== Tenseness ===
Tenseness is used to describe the opposition of tense vowels vs. lax vowels. This opposition has traditionally been thought to be a result of greater muscular tension, though phonetic experiments have repeatedly failed to show this.

Unlike the other features of vowel quality, tenseness is only applicable to the few languages that have this opposition (mainly Germanic languages, e.g. German), whereas the vowels of the other languages (e.g. Spanish) cannot be described with respect to tenseness in any meaningful way.

One may distinguish the English tense vs. lax vowels roughly, with its spelling. Tense vowels usually occur in words with the final silent ⟨e⟩, as in mate. Lax vowels occur in words without the silent ⟨e⟩, such as mat. In American English, lax vowels [ɪ, ʊ, ɛ, ʌ, æ] do not appear in stressed open syllables.

In traditional grammar, long vowels vs. short vowels are more commonly used, compared to tense and lax. The two sets of terms are used interchangeably by some because the features are concomitant in some varieties of English. In most Germanic languages, lax vowels can only occur in closed syllables. Therefore, they are also known as checked vowels, whereas the tense vowels are called free vowels since they can occur in any kind of syllable.

=== Tongue root position ===
Advanced tongue root (ATR) is a feature common across much of Africa, the Pacific Northwest, and scattered other languages such as Modern Mongolian. The contrast between advanced and retracted tongue root resembles the tense-lax contrast acoustically, but they are articulated differently. Those vowels involve noticeable tension in the vocal tract.

=== Secondary narrowings in the vocal tract ===
Pharyngealized vowels occur in some languages like Sedang and the Tungusic languages. Pharyngealization is similar in articulation to retracted tongue root but is acoustically distinct.

A stronger degree of pharyngealization occurs in the Northeast Caucasian languages and the Khoisan languages. They might be called epiglottalized since the primary constriction is at the tip of the epiglottis.

The greatest degree of pharyngealization is found in the strident vowels of the Khoisan languages, where the larynx is raised, and the pharynx constricted, so that either the epiglottis or the arytenoid cartilages vibrate instead of the vocal cords.

The terms pharyngealized, epiglottalized, strident, and sphincteric are sometimes used interchangeably.

==== Rhotic vowels ====
Rhotic vowels are the "R-colored vowels" of American English and a few other languages.

=== Reduced vowels ===
Common reduced vowels (IPA provides only ⟨ə⟩ and ⟨ɐ⟩)
	Near- front	Central	Near- back
Near-close	ᵻ ʏ̵ ᵿ		
Mid		ə	
Near-open		ɐ	

Some languages, such as English and Russian, have what are called 'reduced', 'weak' or 'obscure' vowels in some unstressed positions. These do not correspond one-to-one with the vowel sounds that occur in stressed position (so-called 'full' vowels), and they tend to be mid-centralized in comparison, as well as having reduced rounding or spreading. The IPA has long provided two letters for obscure vowels, mid ⟨ə⟩ and near-open ⟨ɐ⟩, neither of which are defined for rounding. Dialects of English may have up to four phonemic reduced vowels: near-open /ɐ/, mid /ə/, and near-close unrounded /ɪ̈/ and (protruded) rounded /ʊ̈/. (The para-IPA letters ⟨ᵻ⟩ and ⟨ᵿ⟩ may be used for the latter to avoid confusion with the clearly defined values of IPA letters like ⟨ɨ⟩ and ⟨ɵ⟩, which are also commonly seen, since the IPA only provides for two reduced vowels.) Some languages also have a near-close compressed rounded vowel /ʏ̈/ (para-IPA ⟨ʏ̵⟩).

== Acoustics ==
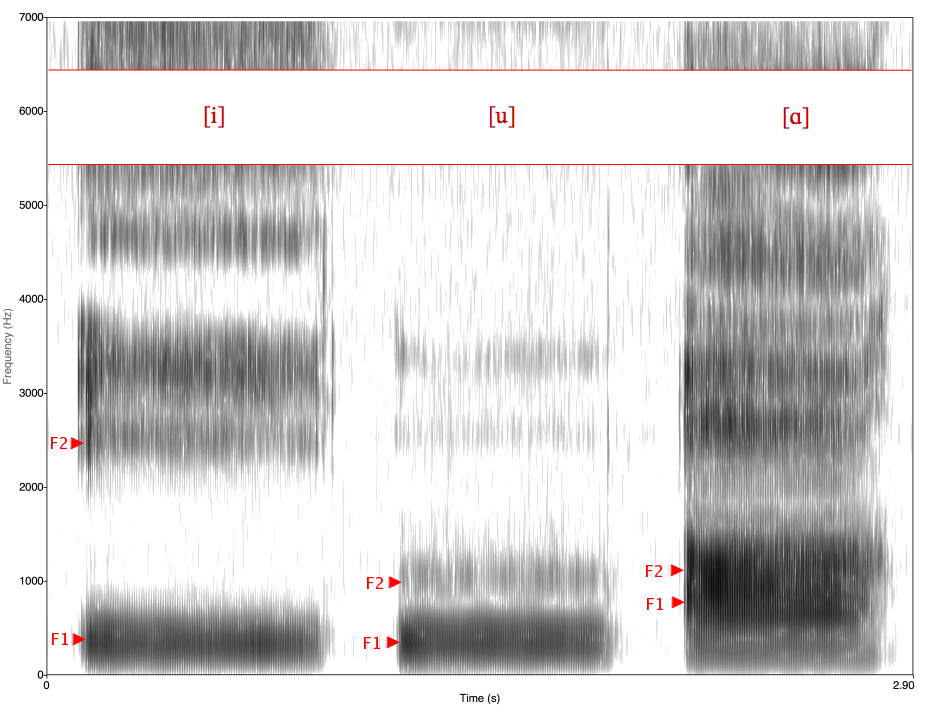
Spectrogram of vowels [i, u, ɑ]. [ɑ] is a low vowel, so its F_{1} value is higher than that of [i] and [u], which are high vowels. [i] is a front vowel, so its F_{2} is substantially higher than that of [u] and [ɑ], which are back vowels.

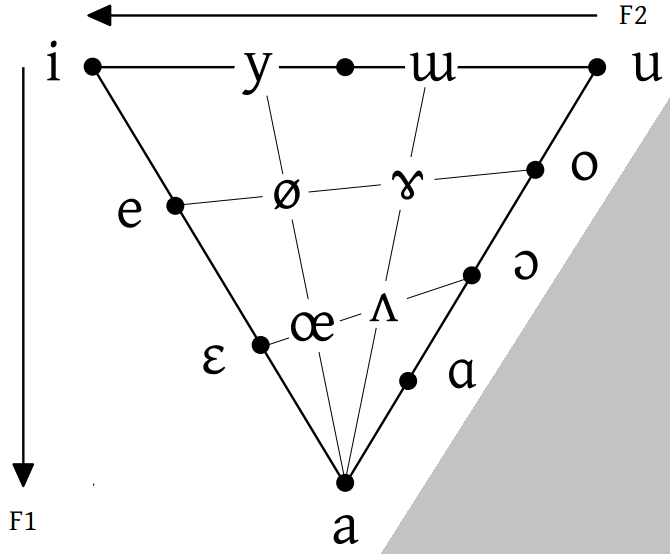
An idealized schematic of vowel space, based on the formants of Daniel Jones and John Wells pronouncing the cardinal vowels of the IPA. The scale is logarithmic. The grey range is where F_{2} would be less than F_{1}, which by definition is impossible. [a] is an extra-low central vowel. Phonemically it may be front or back, depending on the language. Rounded vowels that are front in tongue position are front-central in formant space, while unrounded vowels that are back in articulation are back-central in formant space. Thus [y ɯ] have perhaps similar F_{1} and F_{2} values to the high central vowels [ɨ ʉ], being distinguished by rounding (F3); similarly [ø ɤ] vs central [ɘ ɵ] and [œ ʌ] vs central [ɜ ɞ].

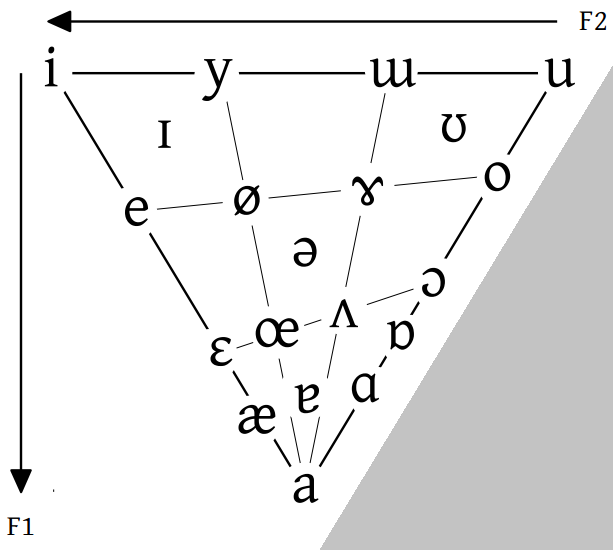
The same chart, with a few intermediate vowels. Low front [æ] is intermediate between [a] and [ɛ], while [ɒ] is intermediate between [ɑ] and [ɔ]. The back vowels change gradually in rounding, from unrounded [ɑ] and slightly rounded [ɒ] to tightly rounded [u]; similarly slightly rounded [œ] to tightly rounded [y]. With [a] seen as an (extra-)low central vowel, the vowels [æ ɐ ɑ] can be redefined as front, central and back (near-)low vowels.

The acoustics of vowels are fairly well understood. The different vowel qualities are realized in acoustic analyses of vowels by the relative values of the formants, acoustic resonances of the vocal tract which show up as dark bands on a spectrogram. The vocal tract acts as a resonant cavity, and the position of the jaw, lips, and tongue affect the parameters of the resonant cavity, resulting in different formant values. The acoustics of vowels can be visualized using spectrograms, which display the acoustic energy at each frequency, and how this changes with time.

The first formant, abbreviated F_{1}, corresponds to vowel height. Open vowels have high F_{1} frequencies, while close vowels have low F_{1} frequencies, as can be seen in the accompanying spectrogram: The vowels [i] and [u] have similar low first formants, whereas [ɑ] has a higher formant.

The second formant, F_{2}, corresponds to vowel backness. Back vowels have low F_{2} frequencies, while front vowels have high F_{2} frequencies. This is very clear in the spectrogram, where the front vowel [i] has a much higher F_{2} frequency than the other two vowels. However, in open vowels, the high F_{1} frequency forces a rise in the F_{2} frequency as well, so an alternative measure of frontness is the difference between the first and second formants. For this reason, some people prefer to plot as F_{1} vs. F_{2} – F_{1}. (This dimension is usually called 'backness' rather than 'frontness', but the term 'backness' can be counterintuitive when discussing formants.)

In the third edition of his textbook, Peter Ladefoged recommended using plots of F_{1} against F_{2} – F_{1} to represent vowel quality. However, in the fourth edition, he changed to adopt a simple plot of F_{1} against F_{2}, and this simple plot of F_{1} against F_{2} was maintained for the fifth edition of the book. Katrina Hayward compares the two types of plots and concludes that plotting of F_{1} against F_{2} – F_{1} "is not very satisfactory because of its effect on the placing of the central vowels", so she also recommends use of a simple plot of F_{1} against F_{2}. In fact, this kind of plot of F_{1} against F_{2} has been used by analysts to show the quality of the vowels in a wide range of languages, including RP, the Queen's English, American English, Singapore English, Brunei English, North Frisian, Turkish Kabardian, and various indigenous Australian languages.

Acoustically, rounded vowels are identified chiefly by a lowering in F_{2}, which tends to reinforce vowel backness; however, F_{1} is also somewhat lowered in back rounded vowels, and F_{3} (the third formant) is somewhat lowered in front rounded vowels. One effect of this is that rounded vowels tend to plot to the right of unrounded vowels in vowel formant charts; that is, there is an acoustic reason for plotting vowel pairs the way they are.

R-colored vowels are characterized by markedly lowered F_{3} values; this feature is neither as strong nor as defining in front rounded vowels.

== Prosody and intonation ==
In addition to variation in vowel quality as described above, vowels vary as a result of differences in prosody. The most important prosodic variables are pitch (fundamental frequency), loudness (intensity) and length (duration). However, the features of prosody are usually considered to apply not to the vowel itself, but to the syllable in which the vowel occurs. In other words, the domain of prosody is the syllable, not the segment (vowel or consonant). We can list briefly the effect of prosody on the vowel component of a syllable.

- Pitch: in the case of a syllable such as 'cat', the only voiced portion of the syllable is the vowel, so the vowel carries the pitch information. This may relate to the syllable in which it occurs, or to a larger stretch of speech to which an intonation contour belongs. In a word such as 'man', all the segments in the syllable are sonorant and all will participate in any pitch variation.
- Loudness: this variable has been traditionally associated with linguistic stress, though other factors are usually involved in this. Lehiste (ibid) argues that stress, or loudness, could not be associated with a single segment in a syllable independently of the rest of the syllable (p. 147). This means that vowel loudness is a concomitant of the loudness of the syllable in which it occurs.
- Length: it is important to distinguish two aspects of vowel length. One is the phonological difference in length exhibited by some languages. Japanese, Finnish, Hungarian, Arabic and Latin have a two-way phonemic contrast between short and long vowels. The Mixe language has a three-way contrast among short, half-long, and long vowels. The other type of length variation in vowels is non-distinctive, and is the result of prosodic variation in speech: vowels tend to be lengthened when in a stressed syllable, or when utterance rate is slow.

== Monophthongs, diphthongs, triphthongs ==
A vowel sound whose quality does not change throughout the vowel is called a monophthong. Monophthongs are sometimes called "pure" or "stable" vowels. A vowel sound that glides from one quality to another is called a diphthong, and a vowel sound that glides successively through three qualities is a triphthong.

All languages have monophthongs and many languages have diphthongs, but triphthongs or vowel sounds with even more target qualities are relatively rare cross-linguistically. English has all three types: the vowel sound in hit is a monophthong /ɪ/, the vowel sound in boy is in most dialects a diphthong /ɔɪ/, and the vowel sounds of flower, /aʊər/, form a triphthong or disyllable, depending on the dialect.

In phonology, diphthongs and triphthongs are distinguished from sequences of monophthongs by whether the vowel sound may be analyzed into distinct phonemes. For example, the vowel sounds in a two-syllable pronunciation of the word flower (/ˈflaʊ.ər/) phonetically form a disyllabic triphthong but are phonologically a sequence of a diphthong (represented by the letters ⟨ow⟩) and a monophthong (represented by the letters ⟨er⟩). Some linguists use the terms diphthong and triphthong only in this phonemic sense.

== Written vowels ==
The name "vowel" is often used for the symbols that represent vowel sounds in a language's writing system, particularly if the language uses an alphabet. In writing systems based on the Latin alphabet, the letters ⟨a⟩, ⟨e⟩, ⟨i⟩, ⟨o⟩, ⟨u⟩, ⟨w⟩, ⟨y⟩, and sometimes others can all be used to represent vowels. However, not all of these letters represent the vowels in all languages that use this writing, or even consistently within one language. Some of them, especially ⟨w⟩ and ⟨y⟩, are also used to represent approximant consonants. Moreover, a vowel might be represented by a letter usually reserved for consonants, or a combination of letters, particularly where one letter represents several sounds at once, or vice versa; examples from English include ⟨igh⟩ in "thigh" and ⟨x⟩ in "x-ray". In addition, extensions of the Latin alphabet have such independent vowel letters as ⟨ą⟩, ⟨ę⟩, ⟨į⟩, ⟨ǫ⟩, and ⟨ų⟩.

The phonetic values vary considerably by language, and some orthographies use ⟨i⟩ and ⟨y⟩ for the consonant [j], e.g., initial ⟨i⟩ in Italian or Romanian and initial ⟨y⟩ in English. In the original Latin alphabet, there was no written distinction between ⟨v⟩ and ⟨u⟩, and the letter represented the approximant [w] and the vowels [u] and [ʊ]. In Modern Welsh, ⟨w⟩ represents these same sounds. There is not necessarily a direct one-to-one correspondence between the vowel sounds of a language and the letters of an orthography. Many orthographies that use a Latin alphabet have more vowel sounds than can be represented by the standard set of five vowel letters. In English spelling, the five letters ⟨a⟩ ⟨e⟩ ⟨i⟩ ⟨o⟩ and ⟨u⟩ can represent a variety of vowel sounds, while the letter ⟨y⟩ frequently represents vowels (as in e.g., "gym", "happy", or the diphthongs in "cry", "thyme"); (Note: In wyrm and myrrh, there is neither a vowel letter nor, in rhotic dialects, a vowel sound.) ⟨w⟩ is used in representing some diphthongs (as in "cow") and to represent a monophthong in the borrowed words "cwm" and "crwth" (sometimes cruth).

Other orthographies cope with the limitation in the number of Latin vowel letters in similar ways. Many orthographies make extensive use of combinations of letters to represent various sounds. Other orthographies use vowel letters with diacritical marks. Some orthographies have additional vowel letters created by modifying the standard Latin vowels in other ways, such as ⟨æ⟩ and ⟨ø⟩ found in some of the Scandinavian orthographies. The International Phonetic Alphabet has a set of 28 letters representing the range of essential vowel qualities, and a further set of diacritics to denote variations of the basic sound.

The writing systems used for some languages, such as the Hebrew alphabet and the Arabic alphabet, do not ordinarily mark all the vowels, since they are frequently unnecessary in identifying a word. Technically, these are called abjads rather than alphabets. Although it is possible to construct English sentences that can be understood without written vowels (cn y rd ths?), single words in English lacking written vowels can be indistinguishable; consider dd, which could be any of dad, dada, dado, dead, deed, did, died, diode, dodo, dud, dude, odd, add, and aided. (Abjads generally express some word-internal vowels and all word-initial and word-final vowels, whereby the ambiguity will be much reduced.) The Masoretes devised a vowel notation system for Hebrew Jewish scripture that is still widely used, as well as the trope symbols used for its cantillation; both are part of oral tradition and still the basis for many bible translations—Jewish and Christian.

=== Shifts ===
The differences in pronunciation of vowel letters between English and the orthographies of related languages can be partly accounted for by the Great Vowel Shift. After printing was introduced to England, and therefore after spelling was more or less standardized, a series of dramatic changes in the pronunciation of the vowel phonemes occurred, and continued into recent centuries, but were not reflected in the spelling system. This has led to numerous inconsistencies in the spelling of English vowel sounds and the pronunciation of English vowel letters (and to the mispronunciation of foreign words and names by speakers of English).

== Audio samples ==
IPA: Vowels

	Front	Central	Back
Close	i y	ɨ ʉ	ɯ u
Near-close	ɪ ʏ		ʊ
Close-mid	e ø	ɘ ɵ	ɤ o
Mid	e̞ ø̞	ə	ɤ̞ o̞
Open-mid	ɛ œ	ɜ ɞ	ʌ ɔ
Near-open	æ	ɐ
Open	a ɶ	ä	ɑ ɒ

- IPA help
- audio help
- full chart
- template

Legend: unrounded • rounded

== Systems ==
The importance of vowels in distinguishing one word from another varies from language to language. Nearly all languages have at least three phonemic vowels, usually /i/, /a/, /u/ as in Classical Arabic, some Malayic languages of Borneo (including Banjarese) and Inuktitut, though Adyghe and many Sepik languages have a vertical vowel system of /ɨ/, /ə/, /a/. Very few languages have fewer, though some Arrernte, Circassian, and Ndu languages have been argued to have just two, /ə/ and /a/, with [ɨ] being epenthetic.

It is not straightforward to say which language has the most vowels, since that depends on how they are counted. For example, long vowels, nasal vowels, and various phonations may or may not be counted separately; indeed, it may sometimes be unclear if phonation belongs to the vowels or the consonants of a language. If such things are ignored and only vowels with dedicated IPA letters ('vowel qualities') are considered, then very few languages have more than ten. The Germanic languages have some of the largest inventories: Standard Danish has 11 to 13 short vowels (/(a), ɑ, (ɐ), e, ə, ɛ, i, o, ɔ, u, ø, œ, y/), while the Amstetten dialect of Bavarian has been reported to have thirteen long vowels: /i, y, e, ø, ɛ, œ, æ, ɶ, a, ɒ, ɔ, o, u/. The situation can be quite disparate within a same family language: Spanish and French are two closely related Romance languages but Spanish has only five vowel qualities, /a, e, i, o, u/, while classical French has eleven: /a, ɑ, e, ɛ, i, o, ɔ, u, y, œ, ø/ and four nasal vowels /ɑ̃/, /ɛ̃/, /ɔ̃/ and /œ̃/. The Mon–Khmer languages of Southeast Asia also have some large inventories, such as the ten vowels of Khmer: /i, ɨ, e, ɛ, a, ɑ, ɔ, o, u, ə/. Wu dialects have the largest inventories of Chinese; the Jinhui dialect of Wu has also been reported to have eleven vowels: ten basic vowels, /i, y, e, ø, ɛ, ɑ, ɔ, o, u, ɯ/, plus restricted /ɨ/; this does not count the seven nasal vowels.

One of the most common vowels is [a̠]; it is nearly universal for a language to have at least one open vowel, though most dialects of English have an [æ] and a [ɑ]—and often an [ɒ], all open vowels—but no central [a]. Some Tagalog and Cebuano speakers have [ɐ] rather than [a], and Dhangu Yolngu is described as having /ɪ ɐ ʊ/, without any peripheral vowels. [i] is also extremely common, though Tehuelche has just the vowels /e a o/ with no close vowels. The third vowel of the Arabic-type three-vowel system, /u/, is considerably less common. A large fraction of the languages of North America happen to have a four-vowel system without /u/: /i, e, a, o/; Nahuatl and Navajo are examples.

In most languages, vowels serve mainly to distinguish separate lexemes, rather than different inflectional forms of the same lexeme as they commonly do in the Semitic languages. For example, while English man becomes men in the plural, moon is a completely different word.

=== Words without vowels ===
In rhotic dialects of English, as in Canada and the United States, there are many words such as bird, learn, girl, church, worst, worm, myrrh that some phoneticians analyze as having no vowels, only a syllabic consonant /ɹ̩/. However, others analyze these words instead as having a rhotic vowel, /ɝː/. The difference may be partially one of dialect.

There are a few such words that are disyllabic, like cursor, curtain, and turtle: [ˈkɹ̩sɹ̩], [ˈkɹ̩tn̩] and [ˈtɹ̩tl̩] (or [ˈkɝːsɚ], [ˈkɝːtən], and [ˈtɝːtəl]), and even a few that are trisyllabic, at least in some accents, such as purpler [ˈpɹ̩.pl̩.ɹ̩], hurdler [ˈhɹ̩.dl̩.ɹ̩], gurgler [ˈɡɹ̩.ɡl̩.ɹ̩], and certainer [ˈsɹ̩.tn̩.ɹ̩].

The word and frequently contracts to a simple nasal ’n, as in lock 'n key [ˌlɒk ŋ ˈkiː]. Words such as will, have, and is regularly contract to ’ll [l], ’ve [v], and 's [z]. However, none of them are pronounced alone without vowels, so they are not phonological words. Onomatopoeic words that can be pronounced alone, and that have no vowels or ars, include hmm, pst!, shh!, tsk!, and zzz. As in other languages, onomatopoeiae stand outside the normal phonotactics of English.

There are other languages that form lexical words without vowel sounds. In Serbo-Croatian, for example, the consonants [r] and [rː] (the difference is not written) can act as a syllable nucleus and carry rising or falling tone; examples include the tongue-twister na vrh brda vrba mrda and geographic names such as Krk. In Czech and Slovak, either [l] or [r] can stand in for vowels: vlk [vl̩k] "wolf", krk [kr̩k] "neck". A particularly long word without vowels is čtvrthrst, meaning "quarter-handful", with two syllables (one for each R), or scvrnkls, a verb form meaning "you flipped (sth) down" (eg a marble). Whole sentences (usually tongue-twisters) can be made from such words, such as Strč prst skrz krk, meaning "stick a finger through your neck" (pronounced [str̩tʃ pr̩st skr̩s kr̩k]), and Smrž pln skvrn zvlhl z mlh, which means "A morel full of spots wetted from fogs". (Here zvlhl has two syllables based on L; and the preposition z consists of a single consonant. Only prepositions do this in Czech, and they normally link phonetically to the following word, so not really behave as vowelless words.) In Russian, there are also prepositions that consist of a single consonant letter, like k, 'to', v, 'in', and s, 'with'. However, these forms are actually contractions of ko, vo, and so respectively, and these forms are still used in modern Russian before words with certain consonant clusters for ease of pronunciation.

In Kazakh and certain other Turkic languages, words without vowel sounds may occur due to reduction of weak vowels. A common example is the Kazakh word for one: bir, pronounced [br]. Among careful speakers, however, the original vowel may be preserved, and the vowels are always preserved in the orthography.

In Southern varieties of Chinese, such as Cantonese and Minnan, some monosyllabic words are made of exclusively nasals, such as Cantonese [m̩˨˩] "no" and [ŋ̍˩˧] "five". Minnan also has words consisting of a consonant followed by a syllabic nasal, such as pn̄g "cooked rice".

So far, all of these syllabic consonants, at least in the lexical words, have been sonorants, such as [r], [l], [m], and [n], which have a voiced quality similar to vowels. (They can carry tone, for example.) However, there are languages with lexical words that not only contain no vowels, but contain no sonorants at all, like (non-lexical) shh! in English. These include some Berber languages, some languages of the North American Pacific Northwest, such as Nuxalk and Oowekyala, and some Northwest Caucasian languages, such as Abaza.

Berber examples include /tkkststt/ "you took it off" and /tfktstt/ "you gave it". Some words may contain one or two consonants only: /ɡ/ "be", /ks/ "feed on".

Nuxalk and Oowekyala are noteworthy in allowing for the construction of words, phrases and entire sentences using only obstruent consonants. Nuxalk examples include clhpʼxwlhtlhplhhs kwtsʼ "then he/she had a bunchberry plant" kʼclhhtscw slhxwtlhhts "you had seen me go through the passage" and lhxwtlhtscw "you spat on me".

Abaza often drops word-final /ə/ when forming compounds, making combinations such as хъкӏхвбкъвылкӏ /qʰkʼχʷbqʷʼəlkʼ/ "five vats of sour cream" possible. Therefore, even though the dictionary forms хъкӏы /qʰkʼə/ "sour cream" and хвпа /χʷpʰa/ "five" have a schwa at the end, the consonant cluster /qʰkʼ/ and the sole consonant /χʷ/ (-pa is a counting suffix) can be analysed as the full word, with final vowels probably being a result of obligatory nucleus (such as in the first example, where the word бкъвыл /bqʷʼəl/ "vat" is a closed syllable, preventing the vowel deletion, unless /l/ is analysed as a syllabic consonant, which would still make it a nucleus but would make the word vowelless).

In Mandarin Chinese, words and syllables such as sī and zhī are sometimes described as being syllabic fricatives and affricates phonemically, /ś/ and /tʂ́/, but these do have a voiced segment that carries the tone.

In the Japonic language Miyako, there are words with no voiced sounds, such as ss 'dust', kss 'breast/milk', pss 'day', ff 'a comb', kff 'to make', fks 'to build', ksks 'month', sks 'to cut', psks 'to pull'.

Some analyses of Wandala is reported to have no phonemic vowels.

=== Words consisting of only vowels ===
It is not uncommon for short grammatical words to consist of only vowels, such as a and I in English. Lexical words are somewhat rarer in English and are generally restricted to a single syllable: eye, awe, owe, and in non-rhotic accents air, ore, err. Vowel-only words of more than one syllable are generally foreign loans, such as ai (two syllables: /ˈɑːi/) for the maned sloth, or proper names, such as Iowa (in some accents: /ˈaɪ.oʊ.ə/).

However, vowel sequences in hiatus are more freely allowed in some other languages, most famously perhaps in Bantu and Polynesian languages, but also in Japanese and Finnic languages. In such languages there tends to be a larger variety of vowel-only words. In Swahili (Bantu), for example, there is aua 'to survey' and eua 'to purify' (both three syllables); in Japanese, aoi 青い 'blue/green' and oioi 追々 'gradually' (three and four morae); and in Finnish, aie 'intention' and auo 'open!' (both two syllables), although some dialects pronounce them as aije and auvo. In Urdu, āye/aaie آئیے or āyn آئیں 'come' is used. Hawaiian, and the Polynesian languages generally, have unusually large numbers of such words, such as aeāea (a small green fish), which is three syllables: ae.āe.a. Most long words involve reduplication, which is quite productive in Polynesian: ioio 'grooves', eaea 'breath', uaua 'tough' (all four syllables), auēuē 'crying' (five syllables, from uē (uwē) 'to weep'), uoa or uouoa 'false mullet' (sp. fish, three or five syllables).

== See also ==
- English phonology
- Great Vowel Shift
- Inherent vowel
- List of phonetics topics
- Mater lectionis
- Scale of vowels
- Table of vowels
- Vowel coalescence
- Words without vowels
- Zero consonant

== Bibliography ==
- Handbook of the International Phonetic Association, 1999. Cambridge University ISBN 978-0-521-63751-0
- Johnson, Keith, Acoustic & Auditory Phonetics, second edition, 2003. Blackwell ISBN 978-1-4051-0123-3
- Korhonen, Mikko. Koltansaamen opas, 1973. Castreanum ISBN 978-951-45-0189-0
- Ladefoged, Peter, A Course in Phonetics, fifth edition, 2006. Boston, MA: Thomson Wadsworth ISBN 978-1-4130-2079-3
- Ladefoged, Peter, Elements of Acoustic Phonetics, 1995. University of Chicago ISBN 978-0-226-46764-1
- Ladefoged, Peter; Maddieson, Ian (1996). The Sounds of the World's Languages. Oxford: Blackwell. ISBN 0-631-19815-6.
- Ladefoged, Peter, Vowels and Consonants: An Introduction to the Sounds of Languages, 2000. Blackwell ISBN 978-0-631-21412-0.
- Lindau, Mona. (1978). "Vowel features". Language. 54 (3): 541–563. doi:10.2307/412786. JSTOR 412786.
- Stevens, Kenneth N. (1998). Acoustic phonetics. Current studies in linguistics (No. 30). Cambridge, MA: MIT. ISBN 978-0-262-19404-4.
- Stevens, Kenneth N. (2000). "Toward a model for lexical access based on acoustic landmarks and distinctive features" (PDF). The Journal of the Acoustical Society of America. 111 (4): 1872–1891. Bibcode:2002ASAJ..111.1872S. doi:10.1121/1.1458026. PMID 12002871. S2CID 1811670.
- Watt, D. and Tillotson, J. (2001). "A spectrographic analysis of vowel fronting in Bradford English". English World-Wide 22:2, 269–302.

Place →	Labial					Coronal										Dorsal					Laryngeal			
Manner ↓	Bilabial		Labiodental		Linguolabial		Dental		Alveolar		Postalveolar		Retroflex		(Alveolo-)palatal		Velar		Uvular		Pharyngeal/epiglottal		Glottal	
Nasal	m̥	m	ɱ̊	ɱ		n̼	n̪̊	n̪	n̥	n	n̠̊	n̠	ɳ̊	ɳ	ɲ̊	ɲ	ŋ̊	ŋ	ɴ̥	ɴ				
Plosive	p	b	p̪	b̪	t̼	d̼	t̪	d̪	t	d			ʈ	ɖ	c	ɟ	k	ɡ	q	ɢ	ʡ		ʔ	
Sibilant affricate							t̪s̪	d̪z̪	ts	dz	t̠ʃ	d̠ʒ	tʂ	dʐ	tɕ	dʑ								
Non-sibilant affricate	pɸ	bβ	p̪f	b̪v			t̪θ	d̪ð	tɹ̝̊	dɹ̝	t̠ɹ̠̊˔	d̠ɹ̠˔			cç	ɟʝ	kx	ɡɣ	qχ	ɢʁ	ʡʜ	ʡʢ	ʔh	
Sibilant fricative							s̪	z̪	s	z	ʃ	ʒ	ʂ	ʐ	ɕ	ʑ								
Non-sibilant fricative	ɸ	β	f	v	θ̼	ð̼	θ	ð	θ̠	ð̠	ɹ̠̊˔	ɹ̠˔	ɻ̊˔	ɻ˔	ç	ʝ	x	ɣ	χ	ʁ	ħ	ʕ	h	ɦ
Approximant		β̞		ʋ				ð̞		ɹ		ɹ̠		ɻ		j		ɰ						˷
Tap/flap		ⱱ̟		ⱱ					ɾ̥	ɾ			ɽ̊	ɽ						ɢ̆		ʡ̆		
Trill	ʙ̥	ʙ							r̥	r		r̠	ɽ̊r̥	ɽr					ʀ̥	ʀ	ʜ	ʢ		
Lateral affricate									tɬ	dɮ			tꞎ	d𝼅	c𝼆	ɟʎ̝	k𝼄	ɡʟ̝						
Lateral fricative							ɬ̪		ɬ	ɮ			ꞎ	𝼅	𝼆	ʎ̝	𝼄	ʟ̝						
Lateral approximant								l̪	l̥	l		l̠	ɭ̊	ɭ	ʎ̥	ʎ	ʟ̥	ʟ		ʟ̠				
Lateral tap/flap									ɺ̥	ɺ			𝼈̊	𝼈		ʎ̆		ʟ̆						

		BL	LD	D	A	PA	RF	P	V	U
Implosive	Voiced	ɓ			ɗ		ᶑ	ʄ	ɠ	ʛ
Implosive	Voiceless	ɓ̥			ɗ̥		ᶑ̊	ʄ̊	ɠ̊	ʛ̥
Ejective	Stop	pʼ			tʼ		ʈʼ	cʼ	kʼ	qʼ
Ejective	Affricate		p̪fʼ	tθʼ	tsʼ	tʃʼ	tʂʼ	tɕʼ	kxʼ	qχʼ
Ejective	Fricative	ɸʼ	fʼ	θʼ	sʼ	ʃʼ	ʂʼ	ɕʼ	xʼ	χʼ
Ejective	Lateral affricate				tɬʼ			c𝼆ʼ	k𝼄ʼ	q𝼄ʼ
Ejective	Lateral fricative				ɬʼ					
Click (top: velar; bottom: uvular)	Tenuis	kʘ qʘ		kǀ qǀ	kǃ qǃ		k𝼊 q𝼊	kǂ qǂ		
Click (top: velar; bottom: uvular)	Voiced	ɡʘ ɢʘ		ɡǀ ɢǀ	ɡǃ ɢǃ		ɡ𝼊 ɢ𝼊	ɡǂ ɢǂ		
Click (top: velar; bottom: uvular)	Nasal	ŋʘ ɴʘ		ŋǀ ɴǀ	ŋǃ ɴǃ		ŋ𝼊 ɴ𝼊	ŋǂ ɴǂ	ʞ	
Click (top: velar; bottom: uvular)	Tenuis lateral				kǁ qǁ					
Click (top: velar; bottom: uvular)	Voiced lateral				ɡǁ ɢǁ					
Click (top: velar; bottom: uvular)	Nasal lateral				ŋǁ ɴǁ					
