= Back vowel =

Spoken sound from the back of the mouth

IPA: Vowels

	Front	Central	Back
Close	i y	ɨ ʉ	ɯ u
Near-close	ɪ ʏ		ʊ
Close-mid	e ø	ɘ ɵ	ɤ o
Mid	e̞ ø̞	ə	ɤ̞ o̞
Open-mid	ɛ œ	ɜ ɞ	ʌ ɔ
Near-open	æ	ɐ
Open	a ɶ	ä	ɑ ɒ

- IPA help
- audio
- full chart
- template

Legend: unrounded • rounded

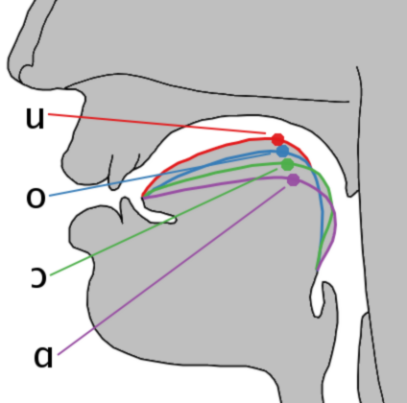
Idealistic tongue positions of cardinal back vowels with highest point indicated

Back vowels are vowel sounds articulated with the primary tongue constriction located toward the back of the oral cavity, from the velum and the pharynx. They contrast with front and central vowels. Under some analyses, back vowels are further broken down into two groups: raised and retracted.

Back vowels are nearly universal across languages. In the PHOIBLE 2.0 convenience sample of phonological inventories, [u] and [o] are among the most frequently listed vowel segments, occurring in 88% and 60% of inventories in the sample, respectively. Back vowels are often, but not always, rounded: cross-linguistically, non-low back vowels are commonly rounded (e.g. [u o]), while low vowels are often unrounded; front rounded vowels and back unrounded vowels also occur, but are less common.

== Transcription conventions ==
In strict IPA usage, the open front unrounded vowel is [a] and the open back unrounded vowel is [ɑ]. However, many phonological traditions use [a] (or the letter ⟨a⟩) more loosely for a low vowel, and recommend clarifying front vs. central/back values when the distinction is important. In descriptions of backness-based vowel harmony, a low vowel written /a/ may pattern with the back-vowel set even when its phonetic realization is not narrowly transcribed as [ɑ].

== Phonology ==
Vowel backness is often treated as a distinctive feature (commonly [±back]) and can participate in processes such as vowel harmony, where vowels within a domain (often the word) systematically agree for backness and sometimes other properties. Back vowels form a class defined by tongue-body retraction, but they may differ in vowel height (e.g. close [u] vs. open [ɑ]) and rounding; intermediate degrees of retraction and centralization can be transcribed with IPA diacritics for relative advancement or retraction and centralization (e.g. ⟨u̟⟩, ⟨u̠⟩, ⟨ü⟩), and some phonetic descriptions further distinguish types of rounding (e.g. protrusion vs. labial compression).

== Acoustics and perception ==
The vowel diagram used in IPA description is primarily a reference space for perceived vowel quality and does not directly encode vocal-tract shapes. Acoustically, perceived vowel backness is correlated (roughly) with the second formant (F2), with back vowels tending to have lower F2 values than front vowels. Lip rounding lowers vocal-tract resonances and can reinforce the acoustic profile associated with back vowels, which has been argued to support the common co-occurrence of backness and rounding.

== Partial list ==
Back (and near-back) vowels with dedicated IPA symbols include:

- close back unrounded vowel [ɯ]
- close back rounded vowel [u]
- near-close near-back rounded vowel [ʊ]
- close-mid back unrounded vowel [ɤ]
- close-mid back rounded vowel [o]
- open-mid back unrounded vowel [ʌ]
- open-mid back rounded vowel [ɔ]
- open back unrounded vowel [ɑ]
- open back rounded vowel [ɒ]

Vowels without dedicated IPA letters can be transcribed using diacritics for relative articulation (e.g. ⟨o̞⟩, ⟨u̠⟩, ⟨u̜⟩).

== See also ==
- Front vowel
- Central vowel
- Vowel harmony
- Relative articulation
- Vowel backness

Place →	Labial					Coronal										Dorsal					Laryngeal			
Manner ↓	Bilabial		Labiodental		Linguolabial		Dental		Alveolar		Postalveolar		Retroflex		(Alveolo-)palatal		Velar		Uvular		Pharyngeal/epiglottal		Glottal	
Nasal	m̥	m	ɱ̊	ɱ		n̼	n̪̊	n̪	n̥	n	n̠̊	n̠	ɳ̊	ɳ	ɲ̊	ɲ	ŋ̊	ŋ	ɴ̥	ɴ				
Plosive	p	b	p̪	b̪	t̼	d̼	t̪	d̪	t	d			ʈ	ɖ	c	ɟ	k	ɡ	q	ɢ	ʡ		ʔ	
Sibilant affricate							t̪s̪	d̪z̪	ts	dz	t̠ʃ	d̠ʒ	tʂ	dʐ	tɕ	dʑ								
Non-sibilant affricate	pɸ	bβ	p̪f	b̪v			t̪θ	d̪ð	tɹ̝̊	dɹ̝	t̠ɹ̠̊˔	d̠ɹ̠˔			cç	ɟʝ	kx	ɡɣ	qχ	ɢʁ	ʡʜ	ʡʢ	ʔh	
Sibilant fricative							s̪	z̪	s	z	ʃ	ʒ	ʂ	ʐ	ɕ	ʑ								
Non-sibilant fricative	ɸ	β	f	v	θ̼	ð̼	θ	ð	θ̠	ð̠	ɹ̠̊˔	ɹ̠˔	ɻ̊˔	ɻ˔	ç	ʝ	x	ɣ	χ	ʁ	ħ	ʕ	h	ɦ
Approximant		β̞		ʋ				ð̞		ɹ		ɹ̠		ɻ		j		ɰ						˷
Tap/flap		ⱱ̟		ⱱ					ɾ̥	ɾ			ɽ̊	ɽ						ɢ̆		ʡ̆		
Trill	ʙ̥	ʙ							r̥	r		r̠	ɽ̊r̥	ɽr					ʀ̥	ʀ	ʜ	ʢ		
Lateral affricate									tɬ	dɮ			tꞎ	d𝼅	c𝼆	ɟʎ̝	k𝼄	ɡʟ̝						
Lateral fricative							ɬ̪		ɬ	ɮ			ꞎ	𝼅	𝼆	ʎ̝	𝼄	ʟ̝						
Lateral approximant								l̪	l̥	l		l̠	ɭ̊	ɭ	ʎ̥	ʎ	ʟ̥	ʟ		ʟ̠				
Lateral tap/flap									ɺ̥	ɺ			𝼈̊	𝼈		ʎ̆		ʟ̆						

		BL	LD	D	A	PA	RF	P	V	U
Implosive	Voiced	ɓ			ɗ		ᶑ	ʄ	ɠ	ʛ
Implosive	Voiceless	ɓ̥			ɗ̥		ᶑ̊	ʄ̊	ɠ̊	ʛ̥
Ejective	Stop	pʼ			tʼ		ʈʼ	cʼ	kʼ	qʼ
Ejective	Affricate		p̪fʼ	t̪θʼ	tsʼ	t̠ʃʼ	tʂʼ	tɕʼ	kxʼ	qχʼ
Ejective	Fricative	ɸʼ	fʼ	θʼ	sʼ	ʃʼ	ʂʼ	ɕʼ	xʼ	χʼ
Ejective	Lateral affricate				tɬʼ			c𝼆ʼ	k𝼄ʼ	q𝼄ʼ
Ejective	Lateral fricative				ɬʼ					
Click (top: velar; bottom: uvular)	Tenuis	kʘ qʘ		kǀ qǀ	kǃ qǃ		k𝼊 q𝼊	kǂ qǂ		
Click (top: velar; bottom: uvular)	Voiced	ɡʘ ɢʘ		ɡǀ ɢǀ	ɡǃ ɢǃ		ɡ𝼊 ɢ𝼊	ɡǂ ɢǂ		
Click (top: velar; bottom: uvular)	Nasal	ŋʘ ɴʘ		ŋǀ ɴǀ	ŋǃ ɴǃ		ŋ𝼊 ɴ𝼊	ŋǂ ɴǂ	ʞ	
Click (top: velar; bottom: uvular)	Tenuis lateral				kǁ qǁ					
Click (top: velar; bottom: uvular)	Voiced lateral				ɡǁ ɢǁ					
Click (top: velar; bottom: uvular)	Nasal lateral				ŋǁ ɴǁ					
