= Open-mid central unrounded vowel =

Vowel sound represented by ⟨ɜ⟩ in IPA

ɜ
- IPA number: 326

Audio sample
- source · help

Encoding
- Entity (decimal): &#604;
- Unicode (hex): U+025C
- X-SAMPA: 3
- Braille: ⠲ (braille pattern dots-256) ⠜ (braille pattern dots-345)
Image

IPA: Vowels

	Front	Central	Back
Close	i y	ɨ ʉ	ɯ u
Near-close	ɪ ʏ		ʊ
Close-mid	e ø	ɘ ɵ	ɤ o
Mid	e̞ ø̞	ə	ɤ̞ o̞
Open-mid	ɛ œ	ɜ ɞ	ʌ ɔ
Near-open	æ	ɐ
Open	a ɶ	ä	ɑ ɒ

- IPA help
- audio
- full chart
- template

Legend: unrounded • rounded

The open-mid central unrounded vowel, or low-mid central unrounded vowel, is a type of vowel sound, used in some spoken languages. The symbol in the International Phonetic Alphabet that represents this sound is ⟨ɜ⟩ (formerly ⟨ᴈ⟩). The IPA symbol is not the digit ⟨3⟩, nor the Cyrillic small letter Ze (з). The symbol is instead a reversed Latinized variant of the lowercase epsilon, ɛ. The value was specified only in 1993; until then, ⟨ɜ⟩ was an alternative symbol for the mid central unrounded vowel [ə].

The ⟨ɜ⟩ letter may be used with a raising diacritic ⟨ɜ̝⟩, to denote the mid central unrounded vowel. It may also be used with a lowering diacritic ⟨ɜ̞⟩, to denote the near-open central unrounded vowel.

Conversely, ⟨ə⟩, the symbol for the mid central vowel may be used with a lowering diacritic ⟨ə̞⟩ to denote the open-mid central unrounded vowel, although that is more specifically written with an additional unrounding diacritic ⟨ə̞͑⟩ to explicitly denote the lack of rounding (the canonical value of IPA ⟨ə⟩ is undefined for rounding).

== Features ==
- Its vowel height is open-mid, also known as low-mid, which means the tongue is positioned halfway between an open vowel (a low vowel) and a mid vowel.
- Its vowel backness is central, which means the tongue is positioned halfway between a front vowel and a back vowel.
- It is unrounded, which means that the lips are not rounded.

== Occurrence ==
Language		Word	IPA	Meaning	Notes
Afrikaans	Standard	lig	[lə̞χ]	'light'	Also described as mid [ə], typically transcribed in IPA with ⟨ə⟩. See Afrikaans phonology
Cotabato Manobo		[bätɜʔ]		'child'	Allophone of /a/ before glottal consonants; may be transcribed in IPA with ⟨ʌ⟩.
Dutch		grappig	[ˈχɾɑpə̞χ]	'funny'	Possible realization of /ə/. See Dutch phonology
Emilian	Bolognese	métter	[ˈmet̪ːɜr]	'to put'	
English	American	bird	[bɜd]	'bird'	Often rhotic. See Rhoticity in English.
English	Ohio	bud	[bɜd]	'bud'	One realization of the vowel transcribed in IPA with ⟨ʌ⟩ in American English, typical of Midland or Southern American English. It is not a standard pronunciation throughout the whole country.
English	Most Texas speakers	bud	[bɜd]	'bud'	One realization of the vowel transcribed in IPA with ⟨ʌ⟩ in American English, typical of Midland or Southern American English. It is not a standard pronunciation throughout the whole country.
English	Northern Wales	bud	[bɜd]	'bud'	Some speakers. Corresponds to /ə/ in other Welsh dialects.
English	Scottish	bud	[bɜ̠d]	'bud'	Somewhat retracted; may be more back /ʌ/ instead.
German	Chemnitz dialect	passe	[ˈb̥ɜsə]	'[I] pass'	Typically transcribed in IPA with ⟨a⟩.
German	Many speakers	herrlich	[ˈhɜːlɪç]	'fantastic'	Common alternative to the diphthong [ɛɐ̯]. See Standard German phonology
Hausa					Possible allophone of /a/, which can be as close as [ə] and as open as [ä].
Jebero		[ˈkɘnmɜʔ]		'indigenous person'	Allophone of /a/ in closed syllables.
Kaingang		[ˈɾɜ]		'mark'	Varies between central [ɜ] and back [ʌ].
Kalagan Kaagan		[mɜˈt̪äs]		'tall'	Allophone of /a/; may be transcribed in IPA with ⟨ʌ⟩.
Kallahan					
Ladin	Gherdëina	Urtijëi	[uʀtiˈʒɜi̯]	Urtijëi	When stressed usually spelled with the letter ë.
Neapolitan	Central Basilicatan varieties (Appennine Area)	pesäre	[pəˈsɜrə] or [pəˈsɜ̃rə]	'to weigh'	Nasalization [ɜ̃] occurs in dialects such as Accetturese.
Paicî		rë	[ɾɜ]	'they' (prefix)	May be transcribed in IPA with ⟨ʌ⟩.
Romanian	Standard	măr	[mə̞r]	'apple'	Typically transcribed in IPA with ⟨ə⟩. See Romanian phonology
Romanian	Transylvanian varieties of Romanian	așa	[aˈʂɜ]	'such'	Corresponds to [ä] in standard Romanian. See Romanian phonology
Sama	Sibutu	[ˈsäpɜw]		'roof'	Allophone of /a/; may be transcribed in IPA with ⟨ʌ⟩.
Sindhi			[sə̞rə̞]	'funeral'	Typically transcribed in IPA with ⟨ə⟩.
Temne		pʌs	[pɜ́s]	'brew'	Typically transcribed in IPA with ⟨ʌ⟩.
Yiddish	Standard	ענלעך	[ˈɛnlɜχ]	'similar'	Unstressed vowel. See Yiddish phonology

== See also ==
- Rhoticized vowel, a related phoneme in rhotic dialects of English

== Notes ==
Place →	Labial					Coronal										Dorsal					Laryngeal			
Manner ↓	Bilabial		Labiodental		Linguolabial		Dental		Alveolar		Postalveolar		Retroflex		(Alveolo-)palatal		Velar		Uvular		Pharyngeal/epiglottal		Glottal	
Nasal	m̥	m	ɱ̊	ɱ		n̼	n̪̊	n̪	n̥	n	n̠̊	n̠	ɳ̊	ɳ	ɲ̊	ɲ	ŋ̊	ŋ	ɴ̥	ɴ				
Plosive	p	b	p̪	b̪	t̼	d̼	t̪	d̪	t	d			ʈ	ɖ	c	ɟ	k	ɡ	q	ɢ	ʡ		ʔ	
Sibilant affricate							t̪s̪	d̪z̪	ts	dz	t̠ʃ	d̠ʒ	tʂ	dʐ	tɕ	dʑ								
Non-sibilant affricate	pɸ	bβ	p̪f	b̪v			t̪θ	d̪ð	tɹ̝̊	dɹ̝	t̠ɹ̠̊˔	d̠ɹ̠˔			cç	ɟʝ	kx	ɡɣ	qχ	ɢʁ	ʡʜ	ʡʢ	ʔh	
Sibilant fricative							s̪	z̪	s	z	ʃ	ʒ	ʂ	ʐ	ɕ	ʑ								
Non-sibilant fricative	ɸ	β	f	v	θ̼	ð̼	θ	ð	θ̠	ð̠	ɹ̠̊˔	ɹ̠˔	ɻ̊˔	ɻ˔	ç	ʝ	x	ɣ	χ	ʁ	ħ	ʕ	h	ɦ
Approximant		β̞		ʋ				ð̞		ɹ		ɹ̠		ɻ		j		ɰ						˷
Tap/flap		ⱱ̟		ⱱ					ɾ̥	ɾ			ɽ̊	ɽ						ɢ̆		ʡ̆		
Trill	ʙ̥	ʙ							r̥	r		r̠	ɽ̊r̥	ɽr					ʀ̥	ʀ	ʜ	ʢ		
Lateral affricate									tɬ	dɮ			tꞎ	d𝼅	c𝼆	ɟʎ̝	k𝼄	ɡʟ̝						
Lateral fricative							ɬ̪		ɬ	ɮ			ꞎ	𝼅	𝼆	ʎ̝	𝼄	ʟ̝						
Lateral approximant								l̪	l̥	l		l̠	ɭ̊	ɭ	ʎ̥	ʎ	ʟ̥	ʟ		ʟ̠				
Lateral tap/flap									ɺ̥	ɺ			𝼈̊	𝼈		ʎ̆		ʟ̆						

		BL	LD	D	A	PA	RF	P	V	U
Implosive	Voiced	ɓ			ɗ		ᶑ	ʄ	ɠ	ʛ
Implosive	Voiceless	ɓ̥			ɗ̥		ᶑ̊	ʄ̊	ɠ̊	ʛ̥
Ejective	Stop	pʼ			tʼ		ʈʼ	cʼ	kʼ	qʼ
Ejective	Affricate		p̪fʼ	t̪θʼ	tsʼ	t̠ʃʼ	tʂʼ	tɕʼ	kxʼ	qχʼ
Ejective	Fricative	ɸʼ	fʼ	θʼ	sʼ	ʃʼ	ʂʼ	ɕʼ	xʼ	χʼ
Ejective	Lateral affricate				tɬʼ			c𝼆ʼ	k𝼄ʼ	q𝼄ʼ
Ejective	Lateral fricative				ɬʼ					
Click (top: velar; bottom: uvular)	Tenuis	kʘ qʘ		kǀ qǀ	kǃ qǃ		k𝼊 q𝼊	kǂ qǂ		
Click (top: velar; bottom: uvular)	Voiced	ɡʘ ɢʘ		ɡǀ ɢǀ	ɡǃ ɢǃ		ɡ𝼊 ɢ𝼊	ɡǂ ɢǂ		
Click (top: velar; bottom: uvular)	Nasal	ŋʘ ɴʘ		ŋǀ ɴǀ	ŋǃ ɴǃ		ŋ𝼊 ɴ𝼊	ŋǂ ɴǂ	ʞ	
Click (top: velar; bottom: uvular)	Tenuis lateral				kǁ qǁ					
Click (top: velar; bottom: uvular)	Voiced lateral				ɡǁ ɢǁ					
Click (top: velar; bottom: uvular)	Nasal lateral				ŋǁ ɴǁ					
