= Front vowel =

Type of vowel

IPA: Vowels

	Front	Central	Back
Close	i y	ɨ ʉ	ɯ u
Near-close	ɪ ʏ		ʊ
Close-mid	e ø	ɘ ɵ	ɤ o
Mid	e̞ ø̞	ə	ɤ̞ o̞
Open-mid	ɛ œ	ɜ ɞ	ʌ ɔ
Near-open	æ	ɐ
Open	a ɶ	ä	ɑ ɒ

- IPA help
- audio
- full chart
- template

Legend: unrounded • rounded

Front vowels are a class of vowel sounds used in spoken languages that are produced when the tongue is positioned toward the front of the mouth. Front vowels appear in most of the world's languages, with [i] and [e] being present in 92% and 61% of languages according to PHOIBLE.

Front vowels can be rounded, but are typically unrounded, meaning that the lips are relaxed while speakers are producing them. This is because languages want to maximize the degree of contrast between vowels. Rounding has the effect of bringing a vowel further back in the mouth, so across the world's languages, it's more common for front vowels to be unrounded than rounded, and for back vowels to be rounded rather than unrounded. This is reflected in the position of rounded front vowels on the IPA vowel chart. They are written to the right of the unrounded front vowels to note that they are typically centralized.

== Partial list ==
The front vowels that have dedicated symbols in the International Phonetic Alphabet are:

- close front unrounded vowel [i]
- close front compressed vowel [y]
- near-close front unrounded vowel [ɪ]
- near-close front compressed vowel [ʏ]
- close-mid front unrounded vowel [e]
- close-mid front compressed vowel [ø]
- open-mid front unrounded vowel [ɛ]
- open-mid front compressed vowel [œ]
- near-open front unrounded vowel [æ]
- open front unrounded vowel [a]
- open front rounded vowel [ɶ]

There also are front vowels without dedicated symbols in the IPA:

- close front protruded vowel [yʷ]
- near-close front protruded vowel [ʏʷ]
- close-mid front protruded vowel [øʷ]
- mid front unrounded vowel [e̞] or [ɛ̝]
- mid front compressed vowel [ø̞] or [œ̝]
- mid front protruded vowel [ø̞ʷ] or [œ̝ʷ]
- open-mid front protruded vowel [œʷ]

As above, other front vowels can be indicated with diacritics of relative articulation applied to letters for neighboring vowels, such as ⟨i̞⟩, ⟨e̝⟩ or ⟨ɪ̟⟩ for a near-close front unrounded vowel.

== Characteristics ==
=== Articulatory ===
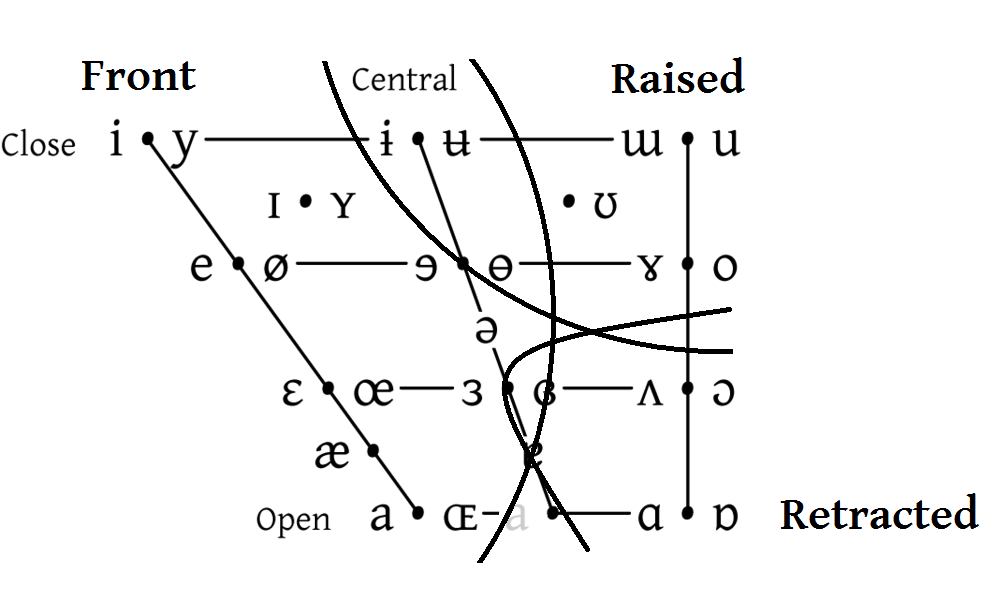
Fronted vowels are one of three articulatory dimensions of vowel space. The prototypical fronted vowel is [i]. Below it in the chart are fronted vowels with jaw opening.

In articulatory phonetics, front vowels traditionally contrast with back vowels. However, John H. Esling posits an alternative analysis, in which front vowels contrast with raised vowels and retracted vowels. In this conception, fronted vowels are a broader category than those listed in the IPA chart, including central vowels [ɨ ʉ ɘ ɵ ə ɜ]. Within the fronted vowels, vowel height (open or close) is determined by the position of the jaw, not by the tongue directly. Phonemic raised and retracted vowels may be phonetically fronted by certain consonants, such as palatals and, in some languages, pharyngeals. For example, /a/ may be fronted to [æ] next to /j/ or /ħ/.

=== Acoustic ===
Acoustically, front vowels have a higher second formant (F2)—the second harmonic from the fundamental frequency—than central and back vowels. The second formant corresponds with how far forward the tongue can be positioned relative to the very back of the mouth. Open-front vowels have a lower F2 than close-front vowels because there is less room for the tongue to move forward when the jaw is hinged open.

== Effect on preceding consonant ==
In many languages, front vowels influence the place of articulation of surrounding consonants. In the following examples, front vowels have altered preceding velar and alveolar consonants, bringing their place of articulation towards palatal or postalveolar. These changes often start as allophonic variation, but may become phonemic.

This historical palatalization is reflected in the orthographies of several European languages, including the ⟨c⟩ and ⟨g⟩ of almost all Romance languages, the ⟨k⟩ and ⟨g⟩ in Norwegian, Swedish, Faroese and Icelandic, and the ⟨κ⟩, ⟨γκ/γγ⟩, ⟨γ⟩ and ⟨χ⟩ in Greek. English follows the French pattern, but without as much regularity. However, for native or early borrowed words affected by palatalization, English has generally altered the spelling after the pronunciation (Examples include cheap, church, cheese, churn from /*k/, and yell, yarn, yearn, yeast from /*ɡ/.)

Language	Grapheme	Before back vowel: non-palatalized ("hard")		Before front vowel: palatalized ("soft")	
Language	Grapheme	Sound	Example	Sound	Example
English	⟨C⟩	[k]	call /kɔːl/	[s]	cell /sɛl/
English	⟨G⟩	[ɡ]	gall /ɡɔːl/	[dʒ]	gel /dʒɛl/
French	⟨C⟩	[k]	Calais [kalɛ]	[s]	cela [səla]
French	⟨G⟩	[ɡ]	gare [ɡaʁ]	[ʒ]	gel [ʒɛl]
Greek	⟨Γ⟩	[ɣ]	γάιδαρος [ˈɣai̯ðaros]	[ʝ]	γη [ʝi]
Greek	⟨Χ⟩	[x]	Χανιά [xaˈɲa]	[ç]	χαίρετε [ˈçerete]
Italian	⟨C⟩	[k]	caro [ˈkaːro]	[tʃ]	città [tʃitˈta]
Italian	⟨G⟩	[ɡ]	gatto [ˈɡatto]	[dʒ]	gente [ˈdʒɛnte]
Italian	⟨SC⟩	[sk]	scusa [ˈskuːza]	[ʃʃ]	pesce [ˈpeʃʃe]
Japanese	⟨S⟩	[s]	sūdoku [sɯꜜːdokɯ]	[ɕ]	shiitake [ɕiꜜːtake] (Note: Palatalization of /si/, /ti/ etc. is shown in spelling in Hepburn romanization.)
Japanese	⟨T⟩	[t]	atatakai [atatakaꜜi]	[tɕ]	dotchi [dotꜜtɕi]
Swedish	⟨K⟩	[k]	karta [ˈkɑ̂ːʈa]	[ɕ]	kär [ɕæːr]
Swedish	⟨G⟩	[ɡ]	god [ɡuːd]	[j]	göra [ˈjœ̂ːra]
Swedish	⟨SK⟩	[sk]	skal [skɑːl]	[ɧ]	skälla [ˈɧɛ̂lːa]

== See also ==
- Central vowel
- Back vowel
- List of phonetics topics
- Relative articulation

Place →	Labial					Coronal										Dorsal					Laryngeal			
Manner ↓	Bilabial		Labiodental		Linguolabial		Dental		Alveolar		Postalveolar		Retroflex		(Alveolo-)palatal		Velar		Uvular		Pharyngeal/epiglottal		Glottal	
Nasal	m̥	m	ɱ̊	ɱ		n̼	n̪̊	n̪	n̥	n	n̠̊	n̠	ɳ̊	ɳ	ɲ̊	ɲ	ŋ̊	ŋ	ɴ̥	ɴ				
Plosive	p	b	p̪	b̪	t̼	d̼	t̪	d̪	t	d			ʈ	ɖ	c	ɟ	k	ɡ	q	ɢ	ʡ		ʔ	
Sibilant affricate							ts̪	dz̪	ts	dz	tʃ	dʒ	tʂ	dʐ	tɕ	dʑ								
Non-sibilant affricate	pɸ	bβ	p̪f	b̪v			tθ	dð	tɹ̝̊	dɹ̝	t̠ɹ̝̊	d̠ɹ̝			cç	ɟʝ	kx	ɡɣ	qχ	ɢʁ	ʡʜ	ʡʢ	ʔh	
Sibilant fricative							s̪	z̪	s	z	ʃ	ʒ	ʂ	ʐ	ɕ	ʑ								
Non-sibilant fricative	ɸ	β	f	v	θ̼	ð̼	θ	ð	θ̠	ð̠	ɹ̝̠̊	ɹ̠᷵	ɻ̥᷵	ɻ᷵	ç	ʝ	x	ɣ	χ	ʁ	ħ	ʕ	h	ɦ
Approximant		β̞		ʋ				ð̞		ɹ		ɹ̠		ɻ		j		ɰ						˷
Tap/flap		ⱱ̟		ⱱ					ɾ̥	ɾ			ɽ̊	ɽ						ɢ̆		ʡ̆		
Trill	ʙ̥	ʙ							r̥	r		r̠	ɽ̊r̥	ɽr					ʀ̥	ʀ	ʜ	ʢ		
Lateral affricate									tɬ	dɮ			tꞎ	d𝼅	c𝼆	ɟʎ̝	k𝼄	ɡʟ̝						
Lateral fricative							ɬ̪		ɬ	ɮ			ꞎ	𝼅	𝼆	ʎ̝	𝼄	ʟ̝						
Lateral approximant								l̪	l̥	l		l̠	ɭ̊	ɭ	ʎ̥	ʎ	ʟ̥	ʟ		ʟ̠				
Lateral tap/flap									ɺ̥	ɺ			𝼈̊	𝼈		ʎ̆		ʟ̆						

		BL	LD	D	A	PA	RF	P	V	U
Implosive	Voiced	ɓ			ɗ		ᶑ	ʄ	ɠ	ʛ
Implosive	Voiceless	ɓ̥			ɗ̥		ᶑ̊	ʄ̊	ɠ̊	ʛ̥
Ejective	Stop	pʼ			tʼ		ʈʼ	cʼ	kʼ	qʼ
Ejective	Affricate		p̪fʼ	tθʼ	tsʼ	tʃʼ	tʂʼ	tɕʼ	kxʼ	qχʼ
Ejective	Fricative	ɸʼ	fʼ	θʼ	sʼ	ʃʼ	ʂʼ	ɕʼ	xʼ	χʼ
Ejective	Lateral affricate				tɬʼ			c𝼆ʼ	k𝼄ʼ	q𝼄ʼ
Ejective	Lateral fricative				ɬʼ					
Click (top: velar; bottom: uvular)	Tenuis	kʘ qʘ		kǀ qǀ	kǃ qǃ		k𝼊 q𝼊	kǂ qǂ		
Click (top: velar; bottom: uvular)	Voiced	ɡʘ ɢʘ		ɡǀ ɢǀ	ɡǃ ɢǃ		ɡ𝼊 ɢ𝼊	ɡǂ ɢǂ		
Click (top: velar; bottom: uvular)	Nasal	ŋʘ ɴʘ		ŋǀ ɴǀ	ŋǃ ɴǃ		ŋ𝼊 ɴ𝼊	ŋǂ ɴǂ	ʞ	
Click (top: velar; bottom: uvular)	Tenuis lateral				kǁ qǁ					
Click (top: velar; bottom: uvular)	Voiced lateral				ɡǁ ɢǁ					
Click (top: velar; bottom: uvular)	Nasal lateral				ŋǁ ɴǁ					
