= Raised vowel =

Type of vowel sound

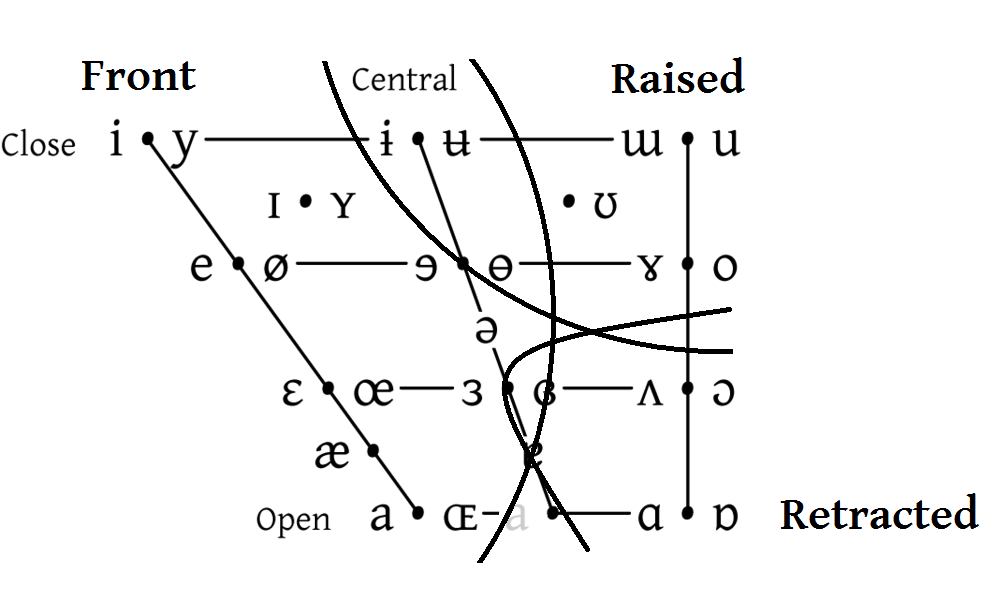
Raised vowels are one of three articulatory dimensions of vowel space

A raised vowel is a vowel sound in which the body of the tongue is raised upward and backward toward the dorsum (soft palate). The most raised cardinal vowels are [u ɯ]; also quite raised are [ʊ], [o ɤ] and [ʉ ɨ].

Raised vowels and retracted vowels constitute the traditional, but articulatorily inaccurate, category of back vowels; they may also overlap many of the central vowels.
