= Amstetten dialect =

Central Bavarian dialect of Austria

- Native to: Austria
- Region: Amstetten, Lower Austria
- Language family: Indo-European: Germanic; West Germanic; Irminonic; High German; Upper German; Bavarian; Central Bavarian; Mostviertel dialect; Amstetten dialect

Language codes
- ISO 639-3: –
- Glottolog: None

The Amstetten dialect is a Central Bavarian dialect spoken in the Austrian town of Amstetten. It is a variant of the Mostviertel dialect.

== Phonology ==
=== Vowels ===
Monophthongs of the Amstetten dialect on a vowel chart, based on formant values in Traunmüller (1982), cited in Ladefoged & Maddieson (1996:290)

Vowel phonemes
	Front	Near-front	Central	Back
Close	i	y		u
Near-close	e	ø		o
Close-mid	ɛ	œ		ɔ
Open-mid	æ	ɶ		ɒ
Open			a	

The Amstetten dialect is very unusual among the world's language varieties in that it can be analyzed as featuring five phonemic vowel heights. Phonetically speaking, the vowels typically transcribed with ⟨æ, ɶ, ɒ⟩ in IPA constitute a series of open-mid vowels ([ɛ, œ, ɔ] in narrow transcription), one-third the distance between the open central /a/ and the close /i, y, u/ in the formant vowel space. The vowels transcribed with ⟨ɛ, œ, ɔ⟩ and ⟨e, ø, o⟩ also differ from the cardinal vowels; the first series is close-mid ([e, ø, o] in narrow transcription), two-thirds the distance between /a/ and /i, y, u/. The remaining /e, ø, o/ are near-close ([e̝, ø̝, o̝] or [ɪ̟, ʏ̟, ʊ̠] in narrow transcription), a series of very high vowels that approach /i, y, u/ in their articulation. Among those, the back [o̝] is somewhat more central [ö̝] than the neighboring [u] and [o].

This rich vowel system is also found in most other dialects of Lower Austria. The open series ⟨æ, ɶ, ɒ⟩ has historically developed from earlier diphthongs ⟨aɛ, ɒœ, aɔ⟩ that are still preserved in Upper Austrian dialects (e.g. Lower Austrian /dætn/ vs. Upper Austrian /daɛtn/ 'to point'). The dialect of Vienna shares with Lower Austrian dialects the monophthongization of these diphthongs, but has conflated the ⟨ɛ, œ, ɔ⟩ and ⟨e, ø, o⟩ series and thus only distinguishes four vowel heights.

== Bibliography ==
- Ladefoged, Peter; Maddieson, Ian (1996). The Sounds of the World's Languages. Oxford: Blackwell. ISBN 0-631-19815-6.
- Traunmüller, Hartmut (1982), "Der Vokalismus im Ostmittelbairischen", Zeitschrift für Dialektologie und Linguistik, 49 (3): 289–333, JSTOR 40501755
