= /y/ sound =

/y/ sound may refer to:

- a close front rounded vowel, /y/.
- a near-close near-front rounded vowel, /ʏ/.
- a voiced palatal approximant consonant, /j/, written in some notations as /y/, usually when the author's and/or reader's language uses the letter ⟨y⟩ to represent that sound, as is the case in English.
