= Open front unrounded vowel =

Vowel sound represented by ⟨a⟩ in IPA

a
- IPA number: 304

Audio sample
- source · help

Encoding
- Entity (decimal): &#97;
- Unicode (hex): U+0061
- X-SAMPA: a
- Braille: ⠁ (braille pattern dots-1)
Image

IPA: Vowels

	Front	Central	Back
Close	i y	ɨ ʉ	ɯ u
Near-close	ɪ ʏ		ʊ
Close-mid	e ø	ɘ ɵ	ɤ o
Mid	e̞ ø̞	ə	ɤ̞ o̞
Open-mid	ɛ œ	ɜ ɞ	ʌ ɔ
Near-open	æ	ɐ
Open	a ɶ	ä	ɑ ɒ

- IPA help
- audio
- full chart
- template

Legend: unrounded • rounded

The open front unrounded vowel, or low front unrounded vowel, is a type of vowel sound used in some spoken languages. It is one of the eight primary cardinal vowels, not directly intended to correspond to a vowel sound of a specific language but rather to serve as a fundamental reference point in a phonetic measuring system.

The symbol in the International Phonetic Alphabet (IPA) that represents this sound is ⟨a⟩, a double-story lowercase a. In the IPA vowel chart it is positioned at the lower-left corner. However, the accuracy of the quadrilateral vowel chart is disputed, and the sound has been analyzed acoustically as extra-open at a position where the front/back distinction has lost its significance. There are also differing interpretations of the exact quality of the vowel: the classic sound recording of [a] by Daniel Jones is slightly more front but not quite as open as that by John Wells.

In practice, the symbol ⟨a⟩ is often used to represent an open central unrounded vowel. This is the usual practice, for example, in the historical study of the English language. The loss of separate symbols for open and near-open front vowels is usually considered unproblematic, because the perceptual difference between the two is quite small, and very few languages contrast the two. If there is a need to specify the backness of the vowel as fully front one can use the symbol ⟨æ̞⟩, which denotes a lowered near-open front unrounded vowel, or ⟨a̟⟩ with the IPA "advanced" diacritic.

== Features ==
- Its vowel height is open, also known as low, which means the tongue is positioned far from the roof of the mouth – that is, low in the mouth.
- Its vowel backness is front, which means the tongue is positioned forward in the mouth without creating a constriction that would be classified as a consonant. This subsumes central open (central low) vowels because the tongue does not have as much flexibility in positioning as it does in the mid and close (high) vowels; the difference between an open front vowel and an open back vowel is similar to the difference between a close front and a close central vowel, or a close central and a close back vowel.
- It is unrounded, which means that the lips are not rounded.

Sagittal section of a vocal tract pronouncing the IPA sound ⟨a⟩. A wavy glottis in this diagram indicates a voiced sound.

== Occurrence ==
Many languages have some form of an unrounded open vowel. For languages that have only a single open vowel, the symbol for this vowel ⟨a⟩ may be used because it is the only open vowel whose symbol is part of the basic Latin alphabet. Whenever marked as such, the vowel is closer to a central [ä] than to a front [a]. However, there may not actually be much of a difference. (See Vowel#Acoustics.)

Language		Word	IPA	Meaning	Notes
Afrikaans	Standard	dak	[da̠k]	'roof'	Near-front. See Afrikaans phonology
Arabic	Standard	أنا (anā)	[ana(ː)]	'I' 1st person singular pronoun	See Arabic phonology
Azerbaijani	Standard	səs	[s̪æ̞s̪]	'sound'	Typically transcribed with ⟨æ⟩.
Bulgarian		най (nay)	[n̪a̠j]	'most'	Near-front.
Catalan	Mallorcan	sac	[ˈs̺ac]	'bag'	Mallorcan /a/-fronting. More central ([ä] and/or [ɐ]) or back ([ɑ]) in other dialects; fully front [a] in Mallorcan Catalan. It can be higher ([æ]). See Catalan phonology
Catalan	Many dialects	raig	[ˈr̺at͡ɕ]	'ray'	Allophone of /a/ in contact with palatal consonants. It can be higher ([æ]). See Catalan phonology
Chinese	Mandarin	安 (ān)	[ʔan˥]	'safe'	Allophone of /a/ before /n/. See Standard Chinese phonology
Czech		zima	[ˈzɪma]	'winter'	See Czech phonology
Dutch	Standard	aas	[aːs]	'bait'	Ranges from front to central. See Dutch phonology
Dutch	Utrecht	bad	[bat]	'bath'	Corresponds to [ɑ] in Northern Standard Dutch. See Dutch phonology
English	Australian	hat	[hat]	'hat'	Most common pronunciation among younger speakers. Older speakers typically use [æ]. See Australian English phonology
English	California	hat	[hat]	'hat'	Less open [æ] in other North American varieties. See English phonology and Canadian Shift
English	Canadian	hat	[hat]	'hat'	Less open [æ] in other North American varieties. See English phonology and Canadian Shift
English	Some Central Ohioan speakers	hat	[hat]	'hat'	Less open [æ] in other North American varieties. See English phonology and Canadian Shift
English	Some Texan speakers	hat	[hat]	'hat'	Less open [æ] in other North American varieties. See English phonology and Canadian Shift
English	Northern Suburbs of Johannesburg	hat	[hat]	'hat'	Closer [æ] in General South African English. See South African English phonology
English	Received Pronunciation	hat	[hat]	'hat'	Closer [æ] in Conservative Received Pronunciation. See English phonology
English	Scouse	hat	[haθ̠]	'hat'	
English	East Anglian	bra	[bɹaː]	'bra'	Realized as central [äː] by middle-class speakers.
English	Inland Northern American	bra	[bɹaː]	'bra'	Less front [ɑ ~ ä] in other American dialects. See Northern Cities Vowel Shift
English	New Zealand	bra	[bɹa̠ː]	'bra'	One realization of /a/ and /aː/ (corresponding to /ʌ/ and /ɑː/ respectively in other dialects). Varies between open near-front [a̠ː], open central [äː], near-open near-front [ɐ̟ː] and near-open central [ɐː]. May be transcribed in IPA with ⟨ɐː⟩. See New Zealand English phonology
French	Conservative Parisian	patte	[pat̪]	'paw'	Contrasts with /ɑ/, but many speakers have only one open vowel (phonetically central [ä]). See French phonology
French	Quebec	arrêt	[aʁɛ]	'stopping'	Contrasts with /ɑ/. See Quebec French phonology
German	Altbayern accent	Wassermassen	[ˈʋɑsɐmasn̩]	'water masses'	Also illustrates the back /ɑ/, with which it contrasts. See Standard German phonology
German	Many Austrian accents	nah	[naː]	'near'	Less front in other accents. See Standard German phonology
Hindustani	Hindi	बाप(baap)	[baːp]	'father', 'dad'	Allophone of [ä~ɑ]. See Hindustani phonology.
Hindustani	Urdu	باپ(baap)	[baːp]	'father', 'dad'	Allophone of [ä~ɑ]. See Hindustani phonology.
Igbo		ákụ	[ákú̙]	'kernel'	
Khmer		បាត់ (băt)	[ɓat]	'to disappear'	See Khmer phonology
Khmer		បាត (bat)	[ɓaːt]	'bottom'	See Khmer phonology
Kurdish	Palewani (Southern)	گه‌ن (gen)	[gan]	'bad'	Equal to Sorani (Central) near-front [æ]. See Kurdish phonology
Limburgish	Many dialects	baas	[ˈba̠ːs]	'boss'	Near-front; realized as central [äː] in some other dialects. The example word is from the Maastrichtian dialect.
Low German		Daag / Dag	[dax]	'day'	Backness may vary among dialects.
Luxembourgish		Kap	[kʰa̠ːpʰ]	'cap'	Near-front; sometimes fronted and raised to [a̝ː]. See Luxembourgish phonology
Malay	Standard	رق (rak)	[raʔ]	'shelf'	Can be central [ä]. See Malay phonology
Norwegian	Stavangersk	hatt	[hat]	'hat'	See Norwegian phonology
Norwegian	Trondheimsk	lær	[læ̞ːɾ]	'leather'	See Norwegian phonology
Polish		jajo	[ˈjajɔ]	'egg'	Allophone of /ä/ between palatal or palatalized consonants. See Polish phonology
Spanish	Eastern Andalusian	las madres	[læ̞ˑ ˈmæ̞ːð̞ɾɛˑ]	'the mothers'	Corresponds to [ä] in other dialects, but in these dialects they are distinct. See Spanish phonology
Spanish	Murcian	las madres	[læ̞ˑ ˈmæ̞ːð̞ɾɛˑ]	'the mothers'	Corresponds to [ä] in other dialects, but in these dialects they are distinct. See Spanish phonology
Swedish	Central Standard	bank	[baŋk]	'bank'	The backness has been variously described as front [a], near-front [a̠] and central [ä]. See Swedish phonology
Turkish		kâğıt	[caˈɯt]	'paper'	Only occurs with â (a with "circumflex"), which is not originally in the Turkish alphabet. Also described as central [ä].
West Frisian	Aastersk	kaaks	[kaːks]	'ship's biscuit'	Contrasts with a back /ɑː/. See West Frisian phonology

== Notes ==
Place →	Labial					Coronal										Dorsal					Laryngeal			
Manner ↓	Bilabial		Labiodental		Linguolabial		Dental		Alveolar		Postalveolar		Retroflex		(Alveolo-)palatal		Velar		Uvular		Pharyngeal/epiglottal		Glottal	
Nasal	m̥	m	ɱ̊	ɱ		n̼	n̪̊	n̪	n̥	n	n̠̊	n̠	ɳ̊	ɳ	ɲ̊	ɲ	ŋ̊	ŋ	ɴ̥	ɴ				
Plosive	p	b	p̪	b̪	t̼	d̼	t̪	d̪	t	d			ʈ	ɖ	c	ɟ	k	ɡ	q	ɢ	ʡ		ʔ	
Sibilant affricate							t̪s̪	d̪z̪	ts	dz	t̠ʃ	d̠ʒ	tʂ	dʐ	tɕ	dʑ								
Non-sibilant affricate	pɸ	bβ	p̪f	b̪v			t̪θ	d̪ð	tɹ̝̊	dɹ̝	t̠ɹ̠̊˔	d̠ɹ̠˔			cç	ɟʝ	kx	ɡɣ	qχ	ɢʁ	ʡʜ	ʡʢ	ʔh	
Sibilant fricative							s̪	z̪	s	z	ʃ	ʒ	ʂ	ʐ	ɕ	ʑ								
Non-sibilant fricative	ɸ	β	f	v	θ̼	ð̼	θ	ð	θ̠	ð̠	ɹ̠̊˔	ɹ̠˔	ɻ̊˔	ɻ˔	ç	ʝ	x	ɣ	χ	ʁ	ħ	ʕ	h	ɦ
Approximant		β̞		ʋ				ð̞		ɹ		ɹ̠		ɻ		j		ɰ						˷
Tap/flap		ⱱ̟		ⱱ					ɾ̥	ɾ			ɽ̊	ɽ						ɢ̆		ʡ̆		
Trill	ʙ̥	ʙ							r̥	r		r̠	ɽ̊r̥	ɽr					ʀ̥	ʀ	ʜ	ʢ		
Lateral affricate									tɬ	dɮ			tꞎ	d𝼅	c𝼆	ɟʎ̝	k𝼄	ɡʟ̝						
Lateral fricative							ɬ̪		ɬ	ɮ			ꞎ	𝼅	𝼆	ʎ̝	𝼄	ʟ̝						
Lateral approximant								l̪	l̥	l		l̠	ɭ̊	ɭ	ʎ̥	ʎ	ʟ̥	ʟ		ʟ̠				
Lateral tap/flap									ɺ̥	ɺ			𝼈̊	𝼈		ʎ̆		ʟ̆						

		BL	LD	D	A	PA	RF	P	V	U
Implosive	Voiced	ɓ			ɗ		ᶑ	ʄ	ɠ	ʛ
Implosive	Voiceless	ɓ̥			ɗ̥		ᶑ̊	ʄ̊	ɠ̊	ʛ̥
Ejective	Stop	pʼ			tʼ		ʈʼ	cʼ	kʼ	qʼ
Ejective	Affricate		p̪fʼ	tθʼ	tsʼ	tʃʼ	tʂʼ	tɕʼ	kxʼ	qχʼ
Ejective	Fricative	ɸʼ	fʼ	θʼ	sʼ	ʃʼ	ʂʼ	ɕʼ	xʼ	χʼ
Ejective	Lateral affricate				tɬʼ			c𝼆ʼ	k𝼄ʼ	q𝼄ʼ
Ejective	Lateral fricative				ɬʼ					
Click (top: velar; bottom: uvular)	Tenuis	kʘ qʘ		kǀ qǀ	kǃ qǃ		k𝼊 q𝼊	kǂ qǂ		
Click (top: velar; bottom: uvular)	Voiced	ɡʘ ɢʘ		ɡǀ ɢǀ	ɡǃ ɢǃ		ɡ𝼊 ɢ𝼊	ɡǂ ɢǂ		
Click (top: velar; bottom: uvular)	Nasal	ŋʘ ɴʘ		ŋǀ ɴǀ	ŋǃ ɴǃ		ŋ𝼊 ɴ𝼊	ŋǂ ɴǂ	ʞ	
Click (top: velar; bottom: uvular)	Tenuis lateral				kǁ qǁ					
Click (top: velar; bottom: uvular)	Voiced lateral				ɡǁ ɢǁ					
Click (top: velar; bottom: uvular)	Nasal lateral				ŋǁ ɴǁ					
