= West Frisian phonology =

West Germanic language phonology

This article is about the phonology and phonetics of the West Frisian language.

== Consonants ==
Standard West Frisian consonants
		Labial	Alveolar	Dorsal	Glottal
Nasal		m	n	ŋ	
Plosive	voiceless	p	t	k	
Plosive	voiced	b	d	ɡ	
Fricative	voiceless	f	s	χ	h
Fricative	voiced	v	z	ɣ	
Trill			r		
Approximant		w	l	j	

- /m, p, b, w/ are bilabial, and /f, v/ are labiodental.
  - /w/ is often included with the diphthongs, rather than the consonants, as it occurs only in rising diphthongs and sequences of a long vowel followed by glide (see the Diphthongs section). However, since they are analysed and transcribed as consonants in this article, /w/ is included here as a consonant. /w/ contrasts with /v/ in for example the pair belove /bəˈloːvə/ - bliuwe /ˈbljoːwə/.
  - In some cases, /d/ alternates with /r/.
  - /r/ does not occur before other alveolar consonants. An exception to that rule are recent loanwords from Standard Dutch (sport), which may or may not be pronounced with [r].
- The alveolar /s, z/ are laminal, laxer than in English (with graver friction) and are variably retracted to [s̠, z̠], depending on the environment. The phonetic affricates [ts, dz] (as in tsiis [tsiːs] 'cheese' and skodzje [ˈskɔdzjə] 'shake') are subject to the same kind of variation. As in Greek, [ts] and [dz] are considered to be stop–fricative sequences in their underlying form.
- /ŋ, k, ɡ, ɣ/ are velar, /χ/ is a post-velar fricative trill [ʀ̝̊˖] and /j/ is palatal.
- Among fricatives, neither /χ/ nor any of the voiced fricatives can occur word-initially except for /v/.
- Glottal stop [ʔ] may precede word-initial vowels. In careful speech, it may also occur between unstressed and stressed vowels or diphthongs.
- All consonants are unaspirated, as in Dutch. Thus, the voiceless plosives /k/, /t/, /p/ are realized [k], [t], [p].

=== Allophony ===
/v/ has two allophones: an approximant [ʋ], which appears word-initially, and a fricative [v], which occurs elsewhere.

The distinction between /ɡ/ and /ɣ/ is very marginal, and they are generally considered allophones of a single phoneme. The plosive [ɡ] generally appears at the beginning of a word and at the beginning of a stressed syllable, with the fricative [ɣ] occurring elsewhere. However, there are some cases that disturb that distribution, which shows that the allophony is not only caused by stress but also has a morphological factor:

- Compound words preserve intact each allophone of the individual words: berchgeit [ˈbɛrɣɡait] 'mountain goat' and needgefal [ˈneːdɡəfɔl] 'emergency'. That demonstrates plosive [ɡ] before unstressed syllables.
- Some suffixes draw the stress onto themselves without readjusting the allophones: hartoch [ˈhatɔχ] 'duke' → hartoginne [hatɔˈɣɪnə] 'duchess'. That creates cases of fricative [ɣ] before stressed syllables.

Thus, it appears that the underlying representation of words includes the plosive-fricative distinction. In single-morpheme words, that representation follows the above rule of allophony, but in words with multiple morphemes the underlying status (plosive or fricative) must be known to recover the correct pronunciation.

The schwa /ə/ is often dropped in the combination /ən/, which turns the /n/ into a syllabic sonorant. The specific sonorant that arises depends on the preceding consonant and so it is labial [m̩] when it is preceded by labial [m, p, b], alveolar [n̩] when it is preceded by labiodental or alveolar /f, v, n, t, d, s, z, r, l/, and velar [ŋ̍] when preceded by velar /k, ɣ/.

The schwa is commonly dropped also in /əl/ and /ər/, creating the syllabic sonorants [l̩] and [r̩], respectively. There are also some other cases.

The sequences /sj, zj/ coalesce to [ɕ, ʑ], unless /j/ occurs as a part of the rising diphthongs /jɪ, jɛ, jø/.

=== Final-obstruent devoicing ===
West Frisian has final obstruent devoicing and so voiced obstruents are merged with the voiceless obstruents at the end of words. Thus, word-final /b, d, v, z, ɣ/ are merged into voiceless /p, t, f, s, χ/, although final /b/ is rare. The spelling reflects that in the case of the fricatives but not in the case of the plosives, which are still written ⟨b⟩ and ⟨d⟩.

== Vowels ==
West Frisian has a large vowel inventory, in which several vowel qualities contrast in length and rounding.

=== Monophthongs ===
Standard West Frisian monophthongs
	Front				Central		Back	
	unrounded		rounded		Central		Back	
	short	long	short	long	short	long	short	long
Close	i	iː	y	yː			u	uː
Close-mid	ɪ	eː	ø	øː	ə		o	oː
Open-mid	ɛ	ɛː			ə		ɔ	ɔː
Open					a	aː		

- The long vowels are considerably longer than the short vowels. The former are generally over 250 ms, and the latter are generally under 150 ms.
- Some speakers merge the long vowels /iː, uː/ with the centering diphthongs /iə, uə/.
- /yː/ is infrequent. It and the other long close rounded vowel /uː/ are absent in the Leeuwarden dialect.
- /ø/ is phonetically central [ɵ] and is quite similar to /ə/. It can be treated as its stressed equivalent. In phonemic transcription, many scholars transcribe it with ⟨ø⟩, but ⟨ɵ⟩ and ⟨ʏ⟩ are occasionally used instead.
- Although they pattern with monophthongs, the long close-mid vowels transcribed /eː, øː, oː/ are often realized as narrow closing diphthongs [ei, øy, ou]. However, there are exceptions: for instance, speakers of the Hindeloopers dialect realize /øː/ as a long monophthong [øː]. Nearly all words with /øː/ are loanwords from Standard Dutch.
- /oː/ does not occur before /s/.
- Although they pattern with monophthongs, the long open-mid vowels transcribed /ɛː, ɔː/ tend to be realized as centring diphthongs [ɛə, ɔə].
- The Hindeloopers and the Súdwesthoeksk dialects also feature open-mid front rounded vowels /œ, œː/, which are not a part of the standard language.
- Many scholars transcribe /a/ with ⟨a⟩, but de Haan (2010) transcribes it with ⟨ɑ⟩, following the usual transcription of the short open vowel in Dutch. Its phonetic quality has been variously described as central [ä] and back [ɑ].
- /aː/ is central [äː].

=== Diphthongs ===
Standard West Frisian diphthongs
Starting point		Ending point		
Starting point		Front	Central	Back
Close	unrounded		iə	
Close	rounded		yə uə	
Close-mid	unrounded		ɪə	
Close-mid	rounded	oi	øə oə	
Open-mid	unrounded	ɛi		
Open-mid	rounded	œy		ɔu
Open	unrounded	ai		ɔu

- In southwestern dialects, the sequences /wa, wo/ are monophthongized to short central [ɞ, ɵ].
- The closeness of both elements of /ɛi/ is somewhat variable and so its phonetic realization is [æi ~ æɪ ~ ɛi ~ ɛɪ].
- The first element of /œy/ is more like [œ] than [ø]. Many scholars transcribe the sound as /øy/, Booij (1989) transcribes it as /ʌy/, but this article transcribes it /œy/ to show that it is clearly distinct from the common diphthongal realization of /øː/ since it has a much lower starting point), and it is virtually identical to /œy/ in Standard Dutch.
- Some scholars transcribe /ɔu/ as /ɔu/, but others transcribe it as /au/. Phonetically, the first element of the diphthong may be either [ɔ] or less often [a].
- Some varieties realize /ai/ as [ɔi]. It is replaced by /ɛi/ in the Wood Frisian dialects.
- Many speakers realise /aːj/ as rounded /ɔːj/.

==== Rising and long diphthongs ====
Frisian is traditionally analysed as having both falling and rising diphthongs. Booij (1989) argues that the rising diphthongs are in fact glide-vowel sequences, not real diphthongs. That view is supported by Hoekstra & Tiersma (2013) who transcribe them with consonant symbols /jɪ, jɛ, wa, wo/, which is the convention that is used in this article.

Frisian also possesses sequences of a long vowel followed by a glide. According to Booij, the glide behaves as a consonant in such sequences since it is shifted entirely to the next syllable when a following vowel is added. Visser also includes sequences of a high vowel plus glide among these. Such sequences are transcribed with a consonant symbol in this article:

- aai /aːj/ ~ aaien /ˈaː.jən/
- bliuw /bljoːw/ ~ bliuwen /ˈbljoː.wən/
- moai /moːj/ ~ moaie /ˈmoː.jə/
- iuw /iːw/ ~ iuwen /ˈiː.wən/
- bloei /bluːj/ ~ bloeie /ˈbluː.jə/

==== Breaking ====
Some falling diphthongs alternate with rising diphthongs:

Falling				Rising			
Diphthong	Orthography	IPA	Translation	Diphthong	Orthography	IPA	Translation
/iə/	stien	/ˈstiən/	'stone'	/jɪ/	stiennen	/ˈstjɪnən/	'stones'
/ɪə/	beam	/ˈbɪəm/	'tree'	/jɛ/	beamke	/ˈbjɛmkə/	'little tree'
/uə/	foet	/ˈfuət/	'foot'	/wo/	fuotten	/ˈfwotən/	'feet'
/oə/	doas	/ˈdoəs/	'box'	/wa/	doaske	/ˈdwaskə/	'little box'
/yə/	sluere	/ˈslyərə/	'to meander'	/jø/	sljurkje	/ˈsljørkjə/	'to meander softly'

- The /yə/ - /jø/ alternation occurs only in the pair mentioned above.

== Bibliography ==
- Booij, Geert (1989). "On the representation of diphthongs in Frisian". Journal of Linguistics. 25 (2): 319–332. doi:10.1017/S0022226700014122. hdl:1887/11157. JSTOR 4176008.
- Collins, Beverley; Mees, Inger M. (1982), "A phonetic description of the consonant system of Standard Dutch (ABN)", Journal of the International Phonetic Association, 12 (1): 2–12, doi:10.1017/S0025100300002358, JSTOR 44526677
- de Haan, Germen J. (2010). Hoekstra, Jarich; Visser, Willem; Jensma, Goffe (eds.). Studies in West Frisian Grammar: Selected Papers by Germen J. de Haan. Amsterdam: John Benjamins Publishing Company. ISBN 978-90-272-5544-0.
- Gussenhoven, Carlos (1999). "Dutch". Handbook of the International Phonetic Association: A guide to the use of the International Phonetic Alphabet. Cambridge: Cambridge University Press. pp. 74–77. ISBN 0-521-65236-7.
- Hoekstra, Eric (2003). "Frisian. Standardization in progress of a language in decay" (PDF). Germanic Standardizations. Past to Present. Vol. 18. Amsterdam: John Benjamins Publishing Company. pp. 193–209. ISBN 978-90-272-1856-8. Archived (PDF) from the original on 30 March 2017.
- Hoekstra, Jarich (2001). "12. Standard West Frisian". In Munske, Horst Haider; Århammar, Hans (eds.). Handbook of Frisian studies. Tübingen: Max Niemeyer Verlag GmbH. pp. 83–98. ISBN 3-484-73048-X.
- Hoekstra, Jarich; Tiersma, Peter Meijes (2013) [First published 1994]. "16 Frisian". In König, Ekkehard; van der Auwera, Johan (eds.). The Germanic Languages. Routledge. pp. 505–531. ISBN 978-0-415-05768-4.
- Hof, Jan Jelles (1933). Friesche Dialectgeographie (PDF) (in Dutch). The Hague: Martinus Nijhoff. Archived (PDF) from the original on 7 October 2016.
- Keil, Benjamin (2003). "Frisian phonology" (PDF). Los Angeles: UCLA Department of Linguistics. Archived (PDF) from the original on 4 March 2016.
- Sipma, Pieter (1913). Phonology & grammar of modern West Frisian. London: Oxford University Press.
- Tiersma, Peter Meijes (1999) [First published 1985 in Dordrecht by Foris Publications]. Frisian Reference Grammar (2nd ed.). Leeuwarden: Fryske Akademy. ISBN 90-6171-886-4.
- van der Veen, Klaas F. (2001). "13. West Frisian Dialectology and Dialects". In Munske, Horst Haider; Århammar, Hans (eds.). Handbook of Frisian studies. Tübingen: Max Niemeyer Verlag GmbH. pp. 98–116. ISBN 3-484-73048-X.
- Visser, Willem (1997). The Syllable in Frisian (PDF) (PhD). Leiden: Holland Institute of Generative Linguistics. ISBN 90-5569-030-9. Archived (PDF) from the original on 4 March 2016.
