= Close-mid central rounded vowel =

Vowel sound represented by ⟨ɵ⟩ in IPA

ɵ
- IPA number: 323

Audio sample
- source · help

Encoding
- Entity (decimal): &#629;
- Unicode (hex): U+0275
- X-SAMPA: 8
- Braille: ⠴ (braille pattern dots-356) ⠕ (braille pattern dots-135)
Image

IPA: Vowels

	Front	Central	Back
Close	i y	ɨ ʉ	ɯ u
Near-close	ɪ ʏ		ʊ
Close-mid	e ø	ɘ ɵ	ɤ o
Mid	e̞ ø̞	ə	ɤ̞ o̞
Open-mid	ɛ œ	ɜ ɞ	ʌ ɔ
Near-open	æ	ɐ
Open	a ɶ	ä	ɑ ɒ

- IPA help
- audio
- full chart
- template

Legend: unrounded • rounded

The close-mid central rounded vowel, or high-mid central rounded vowel, is a type of vowel sound. The symbol in the International Phonetic Alphabet that represents this sound is ⟨ɵ⟩, a lowercase barred letter o. The value was specified only in 1993; until then, ⟨ɵ⟩ represented the mid central rounded vowel [ə̹].

The character ɵ has been used in several Latin-derived alphabets such as the one for Yañalif but then denotes a sound that is different from that of the IPA. The character is homographic with Cyrillic Ө. The Unicode code point is U+019F Ɵ LATIN CAPITAL LETTER O WITH MIDDLE TILDE.

This vowel occurs in Cantonese, French, Russian and Swedish as well as in a number of English dialects as a realization of /ʊ/ (as in foot), /ɜː/ (as in nurse) or /oʊ/ (as in goat). It occurs in Dutch as a realisation of /ʏ/ (as in bus).

== Close-mid central protruded vowel ==
The close-mid central protruded vowel is typically transcribed in IPA simply as ⟨ɵ⟩, and that is the convention used in this article. As there is no dedicated diacritic for protrusion in the IPA, the symbol for the close central rounded vowel with an old diacritic for labialization, ⟨ ̫⟩, can be used as an ad hoc symbol ⟨ɵ̫⟩ for the close central protruded vowel. Another possible transcription is ⟨ɵʷ⟩ or ⟨ɘʷ⟩ (a close central vowel modified by endolabialization), but this could be misread as a diphthong.

=== Features ===
- Its vowel height is close-mid, also known as high-mid, which means the tongue is positioned halfway between a close vowel (a high vowel) and a mid vowel.
- Its vowel backness is central, which means the tongue is positioned halfway between a front vowel and a back vowel.
- Its roundedness is protruded, which means that the corners of the lips are drawn together, and the inner surfaces exposed.

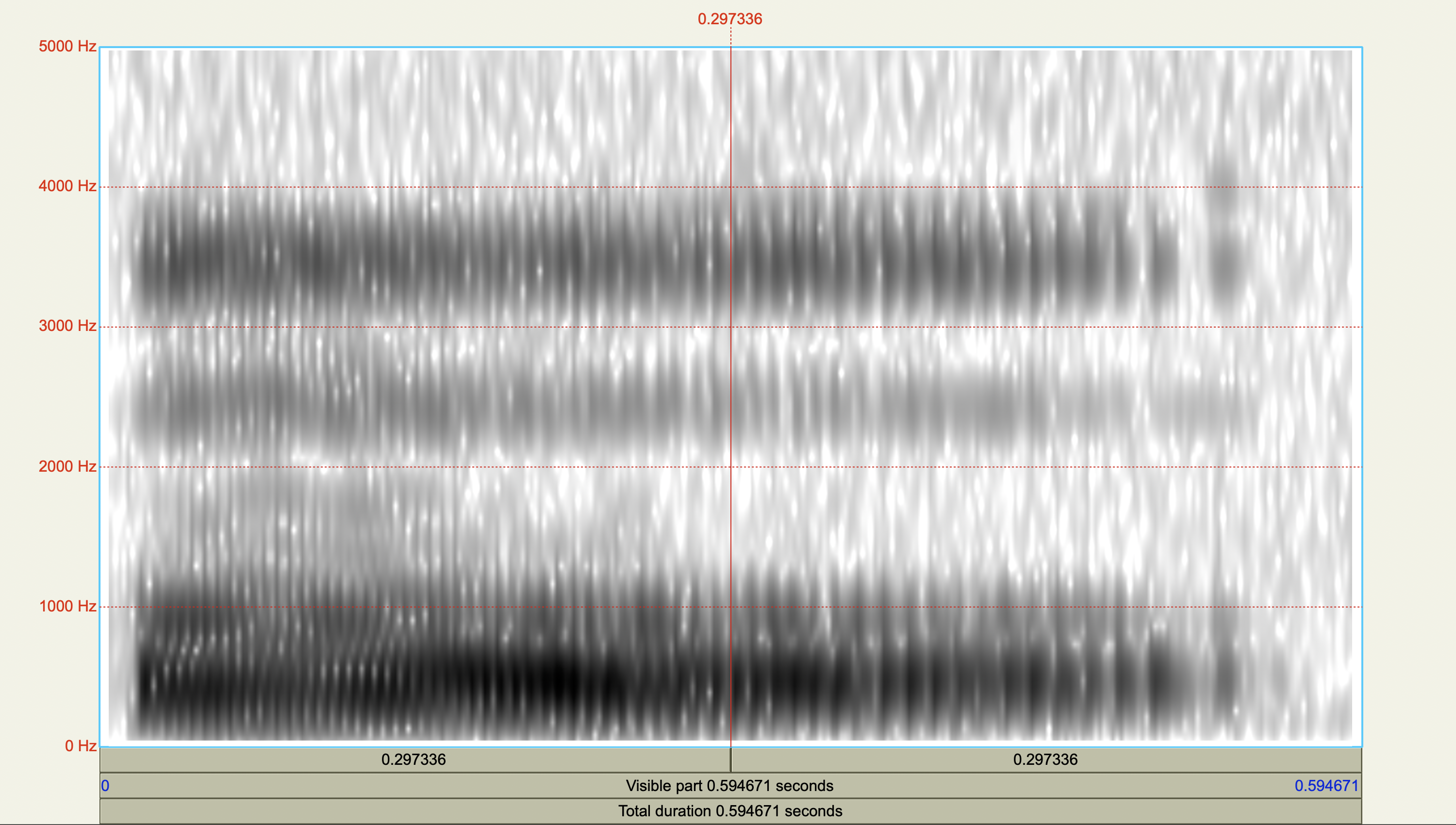
Spectrogram of [ɵ]

=== Occurrence ===
Because central rounded vowels are assumed to have protrusion, and few descriptions cover the distinction, some of the following may actually have compression.

Language		Word	IPA	Meaning	Notes
Asturian	Some Western dialects	fuöra	[ˈfwɵɾɐ]	'outside'	Realization of ⟨o⟩ in the diphthong ⟨uo⟩. May also be realized as [ø] or [œ].
Azeri	Tabriz	göz گؤز	[gɵz]	'eye'	Typically transcribed as /œ/.
Catalan	Mallorcan	sec	[ˈs̺ɵc]	'dry'	See Catalan phonology
Chinese	Cantonese	出/ceot7	[tsʰɵt˥]	'to go out'	See Cantonese phonology
Dutch	Standard	hut	[ɦɵt]	'hut'	See Dutch phonology
English	Cardiff	foot	[fɵt]	'foot'	More often unrounded [ɘ]; corresponds to [ʊ] in other dialects. See English phonology
English	General South African	foot	[fɵt]	'foot'	Younger, especially female speakers. Other speakers have a less front vowel [ʊ]. May be transcribed in IPA with ⟨ʊ̟⟩ or ⟨ʉ̞⟩. See South African English phonology
English	Standard Southern British	foot	[fɵʔt]	'foot'	[ʊ] in more conservative varieties. See English phonology
English	Hull	goat	[ɡɵːt]	'goat'	Corresponds to /oʊ/ in other dialects.
English	New Zealand	bird	[bɵːd]	'bird'	Corresponds to /ɜː(r)/ in other dialects. See New Zealand English phonology
French		je	[ʒɵ]	'I'	May be transcribed in IPA with ⟨ə⟩ or ⟨ɵ⟩. Also described as mid [ɵ̞]. May be more front for a number of speakers. See French phonology
German	Swabian	wird	[ʋɵʕ̞d̥]	'becomes'	Allophone of /i/ before /ʁ/.
German	Upper Saxon	Wunder	[ˈv̞ɵn(d̥)oˤ]	'wonder'	The example word is from the Chemnitz dialect.
Hiw		yöykön̄	[jɵjkɵŋ]	'forget'	
Irish	Munster	dúnadh	[ˈd̪ˠuːn̪ˠө]	'closing'	Allophone of /ə/ adjacent to broad consonants, when the vowel in the preceding syllable is either /uː/ or /ʊ/. See Irish phonology
Kazakh		көз كۆز	[kɵz]	'eye'	Typically transcribed in IPA with ⟨œ⟩.
Limburgish	Most dialects	bluts	[blɵts]	'bump'	Typically transcribed in IPA with ⟨ʏ⟩. The example word is from the Weert dialect.
Limburgish	Maastrichtian	beuk	[bɵːk]	'books'	Sometimes realized as a narrow diphthong [ɵʉ̞]; typically transcribed in IPA with ⟨øː⟩. Front [øː] in other dialects.
Mongolian		өгөх/ögökh	[ɵ̘ɣɵ̘̆x]	'to give'	Allophone of short /o/.
Norwegian	Stavangersk	gull	[ɡɵl]	'gold'	Near-close [ʉ̞] in other dialects that have this vowel. Typically transcribed in IPA with ⟨ʉ⟩. See Norwegian phonology
Norwegian	Urban East	søt	[sɵːt]	'sweet'	Also described as front [ø̫ː]; typically transcribed in IPA with ⟨øː⟩. See Norwegian phonology
Ripuarian	Kerkrade dialect	sjuts	[ʃɵts]	'marksman'	See Kerkrade dialect phonology
Russian		тётя/tyotya	[ˈtʲɵtʲə]	'aunt'	Allophone of /o/ following a palatalized consonant. See Russian phonology
Tajik	Northern dialects	кӯҳ/kūh كوه	[kɵh]	'mountain'	May be realized as mid [ɵ̞], merged with /u/ in the central and southern dialects. See Tajik phonology
Toda		பர்/pȫr	[pɵːr̘]	'name'	
Uzbek		koʻz/кўз/كۆز	[kɵz]	'eye'	Allophone of /o/, especially near velar consonants /k/ and /g/. May be realized as mid [ɵ̞]. See Uzbek phonology
West Frisian	Standard	put	[pɵt]	'well'	Typically transcribed in IPA with ⟨ø⟩. See West Frisian phonology
West Frisian	Southwestern dialects	fuotten	[ˈfɵtn̩]	'feet'	Corresponds to [wo] in other dialects. See West Frisian phonology
Xumi	Lower	ľatsö	[ʎ̟ɐtsɵ˦]	'to filter tea'	Typically transcribed in IPA with ⟨ʉ⟩.
Xumi	Upper	htö	[htɵ]	'way to do things'	Allophone of /o/ after alveolar consonants; may be realized as [o] or [ɤ] instead.

== Close-mid central compressed vowel ==
Close-mid central compressed vowel

ɵ͍

ɘᵝ

ø̈

As there is no official diacritic for compression in the IPA, it is sometimes approximated with the centralizing diacritic used on the front rounded vowel [ø], which is normally compressed. Other possible transcriptions are ⟨ɘᵝ⟩ ([ɘ] modified with labial compression) and ⟨ɵ͍⟩.

=== Features ===
- Its vowel height is close-mid, also known as high-mid, which means the tongue is positioned halfway between a close vowel (a high vowel) and a mid vowel.
- Its vowel backness is central, which means the tongue is positioned halfway between a front vowel and a back vowel.
- Its roundedness is compressed, which means that the margins of the lips are tense and drawn together in such a way that the inner surfaces are not exposed.

=== Occurrence ===
Language		Word	IPA	Meaning	Notes
Swedish	Central Standard	full	[fø̈lː]	'full'	Short form of [yː ~ ʏː]. Engstrand (1990) transcribes the pair as /ɵ ʉː/, placing the short vowel as mid [ø̞̈]. Later sources have contradicted this claim, describing the short vowel as close-mid [ø̈] or fully close [ÿ]. See Swedish phonology
Siberian Tatar	Baraba				

== See also ==
- Index of phonetics articles

== Notes ==
Place →	Labial					Coronal										Dorsal					Laryngeal			
Manner ↓	Bilabial		Labiodental		Linguolabial		Dental		Alveolar		Postalveolar		Retroflex		(Alveolo-)palatal		Velar		Uvular		Pharyngeal/epiglottal		Glottal	
Nasal	m̥	m	ɱ̊	ɱ		n̼	n̪̊	n̪	n̥	n	n̠̊	n̠	ɳ̊	ɳ	ɲ̊	ɲ	ŋ̊	ŋ	ɴ̥	ɴ				
Plosive	p	b	p̪	b̪	t̼	d̼	t̪	d̪	t	d			ʈ	ɖ	c	ɟ	k	ɡ	q	ɢ	ʡ		ʔ	
Sibilant affricate							t̪s̪	d̪z̪	ts	dz	t̠ʃ	d̠ʒ	tʂ	dʐ	tɕ	dʑ								
Non-sibilant affricate	pɸ	bβ	p̪f	b̪v			t̪θ	d̪ð	tɹ̝̊	dɹ̝	t̠ɹ̠̊˔	d̠ɹ̠˔			cç	ɟʝ	kx	ɡɣ	qχ	ɢʁ	ʡʜ	ʡʢ	ʔh	
Sibilant fricative							s̪	z̪	s	z	ʃ	ʒ	ʂ	ʐ	ɕ	ʑ								
Non-sibilant fricative	ɸ	β	f	v	θ̼	ð̼	θ	ð	θ̠	ð̠	ɹ̠̊˔	ɹ̠˔	ɻ̊˔	ɻ˔	ç	ʝ	x	ɣ	χ	ʁ	ħ	ʕ	h	ɦ
Approximant		β̞		ʋ				ð̞		ɹ		ɹ̠		ɻ		j		ɰ						˷
Tap/flap		ⱱ̟		ⱱ					ɾ̥	ɾ			ɽ̊	ɽ						ɢ̆		ʡ̆		
Trill	ʙ̥	ʙ							r̥	r		r̠	ɽ̊r̥	ɽr					ʀ̥	ʀ	ʜ	ʢ		
Lateral affricate									tɬ	dɮ			tꞎ	d𝼅	c𝼆	ɟʎ̝	k𝼄	ɡʟ̝						
Lateral fricative							ɬ̪		ɬ	ɮ			ꞎ	𝼅	𝼆	ʎ̝	𝼄	ʟ̝						
Lateral approximant								l̪	l̥	l		l̠	ɭ̊	ɭ	ʎ̥	ʎ	ʟ̥	ʟ		ʟ̠				
Lateral tap/flap									ɺ̥	ɺ			𝼈̊	𝼈		ʎ̆		ʟ̆						

		BL	LD	D	A	PA	RF	P	V	U
Implosive	Voiced	ɓ			ɗ		ᶑ	ʄ	ɠ	ʛ
Implosive	Voiceless	ɓ̥			ɗ̥		ᶑ̊	ʄ̊	ɠ̊	ʛ̥
Ejective	Stop	pʼ			tʼ		ʈʼ	cʼ	kʼ	qʼ
Ejective	Affricate		p̪fʼ	t̪θʼ	tsʼ	t̠ʃʼ	tʂʼ	tɕʼ	kxʼ	qχʼ
Ejective	Fricative	ɸʼ	fʼ	θʼ	sʼ	ʃʼ	ʂʼ	ɕʼ	xʼ	χʼ
Ejective	Lateral affricate				tɬʼ			c𝼆ʼ	k𝼄ʼ	q𝼄ʼ
Ejective	Lateral fricative				ɬʼ					
Click (top: velar; bottom: uvular)	Tenuis	kʘ qʘ		kǀ qǀ	kǃ qǃ		k𝼊 q𝼊	kǂ qǂ		
Click (top: velar; bottom: uvular)	Voiced	ɡʘ ɢʘ		ɡǀ ɢǀ	ɡǃ ɢǃ		ɡ𝼊 ɢ𝼊	ɡǂ ɢǂ		
Click (top: velar; bottom: uvular)	Nasal	ŋʘ ɴʘ		ŋǀ ɴǀ	ŋǃ ɴǃ		ŋ𝼊 ɴ𝼊	ŋǂ ɴǂ	ʞ	
Click (top: velar; bottom: uvular)	Tenuis lateral				kǁ qǁ					
Click (top: velar; bottom: uvular)	Voiced lateral				ɡǁ ɢǁ					
Click (top: velar; bottom: uvular)	Nasal lateral				ŋǁ ɴǁ					
