= Close-mid back rounded vowel =

Vowel sound represented by ⟨o⟩ in IPA

o
- IPA number: 307

Audio sample
- source · help

Encoding
- Entity (decimal): &#111;
- Unicode (hex): U+006F
- X-SAMPA: o
- Braille: ⠕ (braille pattern dots-135)
Image

IPA: Vowels

	Front	Central	Back
Close	i y	ɨ ʉ	ɯ u
Near-close	ɪ ʏ		ʊ
Close-mid	e ø	ɘ ɵ	ɤ o
Mid	e̞ ø̞	ə	ɤ̞ o̞
Open-mid	ɛ œ	ɜ ɞ	ʌ ɔ
Near-open	æ	ɐ
Open	a ɶ	ä	ɑ ɒ

- IPA help
- audio
- full chart
- template

Legend: unrounded • rounded

The close-mid back rounded vowel, or high-mid back rounded vowel, is a type of vowel sound used in some spoken languages. The symbol in the International Phonetic Alphabet that represents this sound is ⟨o⟩.

== Close-mid back protruded vowel ==
The close-mid back protruded vowel is the most common variant of the close-mid back rounded vowel. It is typically transcribed in IPA simply as ⟨o⟩, and that is the convention used in this article. As there is no dedicated diacritic for protrusion in the IPA, the symbol for the close-mid back rounded vowel with an old diacritic for labialization, ⟨ ̫⟩, can be used as an ad hoc symbol ⟨o̫⟩ for the close-mid back protruded vowel. Another possible transcription is ⟨oʷ⟩ or ⟨ɤʷ⟩ (a close-mid back vowel modified by endolabialization), but this could be misread as a diphthong.

In English, the symbol ⟨o⟩ is typically associated with the vowel in the "goat", but in Received Pronunciation and General American, that vowel is a diphthong whose starting point may be unrounded and more centered than [o]. In Received Pronunciation, the closest vowel to cardinal [o] is the THOUGHT vowel found in words such as caught, horse and hoarse. This is transcribed with ⟨ɔː⟩ by most sources, though the actual realization is closer to [o].

For the close-mid near-back protruded vowel that is usually transcribed with the symbol ⟨ʊ⟩, see near-close back protruded vowel. If the usual symbol is ⟨o⟩, the vowel is listed here.

=== Features ===
- Its vowel height is close-mid, also known as high-mid, which means the tongue is positioned halfway between a close vowel (a high vowel) and a mid vowel.
- Its vowel backness is back, which means the tongue is positioned back in the mouth without creating a constriction that would be classified as a consonant.
- Its place of articulation is velar, which means it is articulated with the back of the tongue (the dorsum) at the soft palate.
- Its roundedness is protruded, which means that the corners of the lips are drawn together, and the inner surfaces exposed.

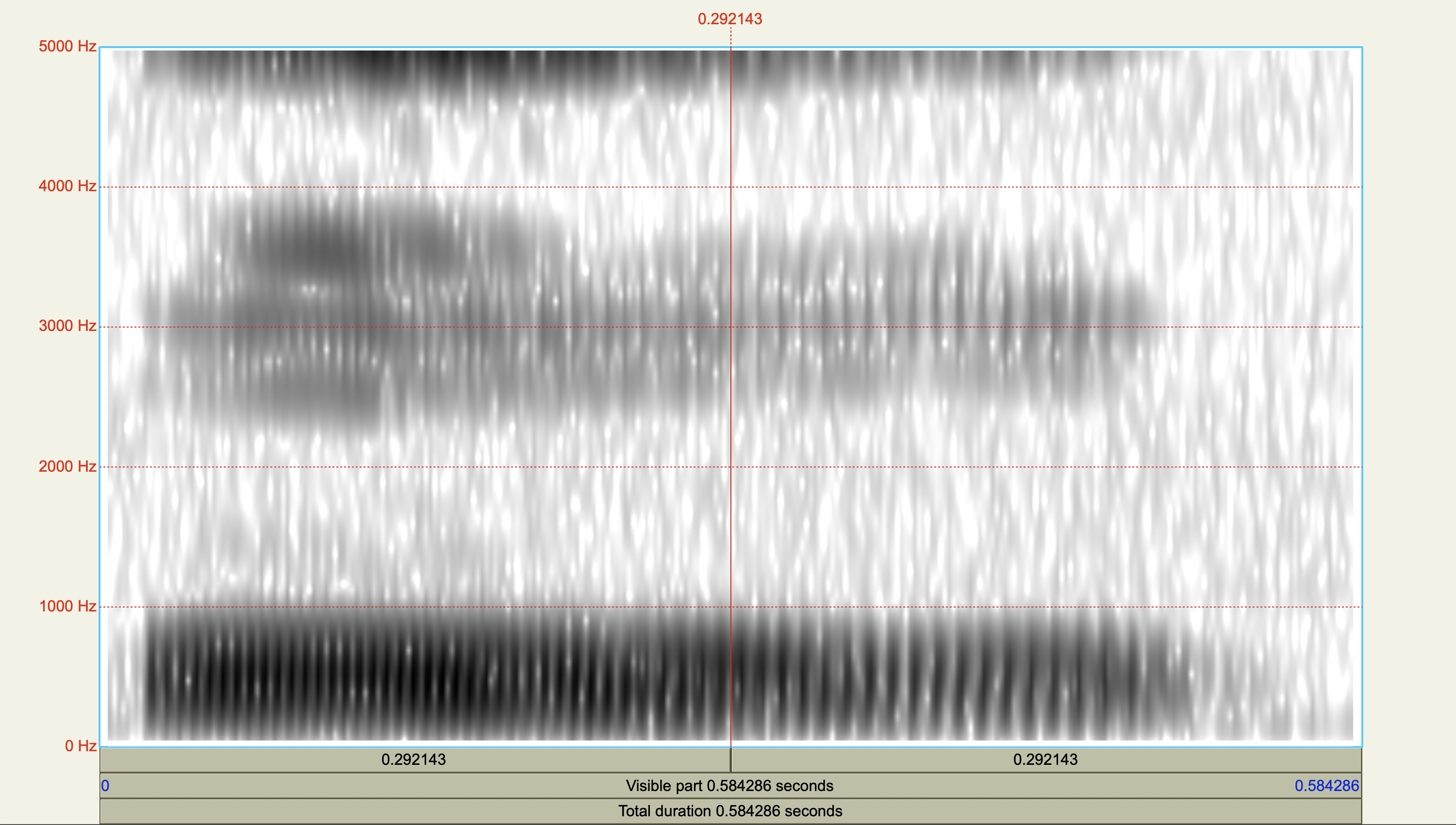
Spectrogram of [o]

=== Occurrence ===
Because back rounded vowels are assumed to have protrusion, and few descriptions cover the distinction, some of the following may actually have compression.

Language		Word	IPA	Meaning	Notes
Afrikaans	Standard	bok	[bok]	'goat'	Typically transcribed in IPA with ⟨ɔ⟩. The height varies between close-mid [o] and mid [ɔ̝]. See Afrikaans phonology
Bavarian	Amstetten dialect				Contrasts close [u], near-close [o̝], close-mid [o] and open-mid [ɔ] back rounded vowels in addition to the open central unrounded [ä]. Typically transcribed in IPA with ⟨ɔ⟩.
Bengali		তোমার	[t̪omɐɾ]	'your'	See Bengali phonology
Bulgarian		уста / usta	[os̪ˈt̪a]	'mouth'	Unstressed allophone of /u/ and /ɔ/. May be transcribed in IPA with ⟨ʊ⟩. See Bulgarian phonology
Catalan		sóc	[ˈs̺ok]	'I am'	See Catalan phonology
Danish	Standard	kone	[ˈkʰoːnə]	'wife'	Also described as near-close [o̝ː]. See Danish phonology
Dutch	Standard Belgian	kool	[koːɫ]	'cabbage'	In the Netherlands often diphthongized to [oʊ]. See Dutch phonology
English	Estuary	yawn	[joːn]	'yawn'	May be [oʊ] or [o̞ː] instead.
English	Cockney	yawn	[joːn]	'yawn'	May be [oʊ] or [o̞ː] instead.
English	Received Pronunciation	yawn	[joːn]	'yawn'	Typically transcribed with ⟨ɔː⟩. See English phonology
English	South African	yawn	[joːn]	'yawn'	General and Broad varieties. Cultivated SAE has a more open vowel. See South African English phonology
English	General Indian	go	[ɡoː]	'go'	
English	General Pakistani	go	[ɡoː]	'go'	Varies between [oː ~ əʊ ~ ʊ].
English	Singaporean	go	[ɡoː]	'go'	
English	Birmingham and the Black Country	cut	[koʔ] 'cut'	Corresponds to /ʌ/ in other dialects.	
Estonian		tool	[toːlʲ]	'chair'	See Estonian phonology
Faroese		tola	[ˈtʰoːla]	'to endure'	May be a diphthong [oɔː ~ oəː] instead. See Faroese phonology
French		réseau	[ʁezo]	'network'	See French phonology
German	Standard	oder	[ˈoːdɐ]	'or'	See Standard German phonology
German	Upper Saxon	sondern	[ˈsɞ̝nd̥oˤn]	'except'	Pharyngealized; corresponds to [ɐ] in Northern Standard German. The example word is from the Chemnitz dialect.
Greek	Sfakian	μεταφράζω / metafrázō	[metafrázo]	'translate'	Corresponds to mid [o̞] in Modern Standard Greek. See Modern Greek phonology
Hindustani (Hindi-Urdu)		ज़ोर/زور / zor	[zoːɾ]	'strength, power'	See Hindustani phonology
Hungarian		kór	[koːr]	'disease'	See Hungarian phonology
Italian		ombra	[ˈombrä]	'shade'	See Italian phonology
Kaingang		pipo	[pɪˈpo]	'toad'	
Khmer		ម៉ូលេគុល / molékŭl	[moːleːkul]	'molecule'	See Khmer phonology
Korean		노래 / norae	[noɾε]	'song'	See Korean phonology
Kurdish	Kurmanji (Northern)	roj	[roːʒ]	'day'	See Kurdish phonology
Kurdish	Sorani (Central)	رۆژ / roj	[roːʒ]	'day'	See Kurdish phonology
Latin	Classical	sol	[soːl]	'sun'	
Limburgish	Most dialects	hoof	[ɦoːf]	'garden'	The example word is from the Maastrichtian dialect.
Lower Sorbian		wocy	[ˈβ̞ot̪͡s̪ɪ]	'(two) eyes'	Diphthongized to [u̯ɔ] in slow speech.
Luxembourgish		Sonn	[zon]	'sun'	Sometimes realized as open-mid [ɔ]. See Luxembourgish phonology
Malay		mampus	[mam.pos]	'die'	Allophone of /u/ in closed-final syllables. May be [ʊ] or [o̞] depending on the speaker. See Malay phonology
Malayalam		ഒന്ന് / onn	[on̪ːɨ̆]	'one'	See Malayalam phonology
Marathi		दोन / dōn	[doːn]	'two'	See Marathi phonology
Minangkabau		sado	[sädoː]	'all'	
Mpade		sko	[sko]	'field'	
Norwegian	Most dialects	lov	[loːʋ]	'law'	The quality varies among dialects; in Urban East Norwegian, it has been variously described as close-mid back [oː] and mid [o̞ː], in Stavangersk it is a close-mid near-back [o̟ː], whereas in Telemark it is a back open-mid vowel [ɔː]. In some dialects it is replaced by the diphthong [ɑʊ]. See Norwegian phonology
Persian		لاک‌پشت / lakpošt	[lɒkˈpoʃt]	'turtle'	
Portuguese		dodô	[doˈdo]	'dodo'	See Portuguese phonology
Polish		wiośnie	[ˈvʲoɕɲɛ]	'spring'	Allophone of /ɔ/ between palatal or palatalized consonants. See Polish phonology
Romanian		acolo	[aˈkolo]	'there'	See Romanian phonology
Saterland Frisian		doalje	[ˈdo̟ːljə]	'to calm'	Near-back; typically transcribed in IPA with ⟨ɔː⟩. Phonetically, it is nearly identical to /ʊ/ ([ʊ̞]). The vowel typically transcribed in IPA with ⟨oː⟩ is actually near-close [o̝ː].
Shiwiar					Allophone of /a/.
Slovak	Some speakers	telefón	[ˈtɛ̝lɛ̝foːn]	'telephone'	Realization of /ɔː/ reported to occur in dialects spoken near the river Ipeľ, as well as - under Hungarian influence - in some other speakers. Corresponds to mid [ɔ̝ː] in standard Slovak. See Slovak phonology
Slovene		moj	[mòːj]	'my'	See Slovene phonology
Sotho		pontsho	[pʼon̩t͡sʰɔ]	'proof'	Contrasts close, near-close and close-mid back rounded vowels. See Sotho phonology
Spanish		camión	[kaˈmjon]	'truck'	See Spanish phonology
Swedish	Central Standard	på	[pʰoː]	'on'	Often a centering diphthong (as in [go̞ɞ̯]). See Swedish phonology
Ukrainian		молодь / molod'	[ˈmɔlodʲ]	'youth'	See Ukrainian phonology
Upper Sorbian		Bóh	[box]	'god'	Diphthongized to [u̯ɔ] in slow speech.
Welsh		nos	[noːs]	'night'	See Welsh phonology
West Frisian		bok	[bok]	'billy-goat'	See West Frisian phonology
Wu Chinese	Shanghainese	瓜 / kò	[ko˩]	'melon'	Specifically in Shanghainese. Height varies between close and close-mid; contrasts with a close to close-mid back compressed vowel.
Yoruba		egba mi o	[egba mi o]	'help'	

== Close-mid back compressed vowel ==
Close-mid back compressed vowel

o᫦

ɤᵝ

As there are no diacritics in the IPA to distinguish protruded and compressed rounding, an old diacritic for labialization, ⟨◌᫦⟩ (the opposite of ⟨◌̫⟩), will be used here as an ad hoc symbol for compressed back vowels. It was only added to Unicode in 2025, however, and it may take some time for font support to catch up. Compression of the lips can be shown with the letter ⟨β̞⟩ as ⟨ɤ͡β̞⟩ (simultaneous [ɤ] and labial compression) or ⟨ɤᵝ⟩ ([ɤ] modified with labial compression), though that can suggest that the vowel is a diphthong.

Only Wu Chinese is known to contrast it with the more typical protruded (endolabial) close-mid back vowel, but the height of both vowels varies from close to close-mid.

=== Features ===
- Its vowel height is close-mid, also known as high-mid, which means the tongue is positioned halfway between a close vowel (a high vowel) and a mid vowel.
- Its vowel backness is back, which means the tongue is positioned back in the mouth without creating a constriction that would be classified as a consonant.
- Its place of articulation is velar, which means it is articulated with the back of the tongue (the dorsum) at the soft palate.
- Its roundedness is compressed, which means that the margins of the lips are tense and drawn together in such a way that the inner surfaces are not exposed.

=== Occurrence ===
Language		Word	IPA	Meaning	Notes
Wu Chinese	Shanghainese	都 / tè	[tɤᵝ˩]	'capital'	Specifically in Shanghainese. Height varies between close and close-mid; contrasts with a close to close-mid back protruded vowel.

== Notes ==
Place →	Labial					Coronal										Dorsal					Laryngeal			
Manner ↓	Bilabial		Labiodental		Linguolabial		Dental		Alveolar		Postalveolar		Retroflex		(Alveolo-)palatal		Velar		Uvular		Pharyngeal/epiglottal		Glottal	
Nasal	m̥	m	ɱ̊	ɱ		n̼	n̪̊	n̪	n̥	n	n̠̊	n̠	ɳ̊	ɳ	ɲ̊	ɲ	ŋ̊	ŋ	ɴ̥	ɴ				
Plosive	p	b	p̪	b̪	t̼	d̼	t̪	d̪	t	d			ʈ	ɖ	c	ɟ	k	ɡ	q	ɢ	ʡ		ʔ	
Sibilant affricate							t̪s̪	d̪z̪	ts	dz	t̠ʃ	d̠ʒ	tʂ	dʐ	tɕ	dʑ								
Non-sibilant affricate	pɸ	bβ	p̪f	b̪v			t̪θ	d̪ð	tɹ̝̊	dɹ̝	t̠ɹ̠̊˔	d̠ɹ̠˔			cç	ɟʝ	kx	ɡɣ	qχ	ɢʁ	ʡʜ	ʡʢ	ʔh	
Sibilant fricative							s̪	z̪	s	z	ʃ	ʒ	ʂ	ʐ	ɕ	ʑ								
Non-sibilant fricative	ɸ	β	f	v	θ̼	ð̼	θ	ð	θ̠	ð̠	ɹ̠̊˔	ɹ̠˔	ɻ̊˔	ɻ˔	ç	ʝ	x	ɣ	χ	ʁ	ħ	ʕ	h	ɦ
Approximant		β̞		ʋ				ð̞		ɹ		ɹ̠		ɻ		j		ɰ						˷
Tap/flap		ⱱ̟		ⱱ					ɾ̥	ɾ			ɽ̊	ɽ						ɢ̆		ʡ̆		
Trill	ʙ̥	ʙ							r̥	r		r̠	ɽ̊r̥	ɽr					ʀ̥	ʀ	ʜ	ʢ		
Lateral affricate									tɬ	dɮ			tꞎ	d𝼅	c𝼆	ɟʎ̝	k𝼄	ɡʟ̝						
Lateral fricative							ɬ̪		ɬ	ɮ			ꞎ	𝼅	𝼆	ʎ̝	𝼄	ʟ̝						
Lateral approximant								l̪	l̥	l		l̠	ɭ̊	ɭ	ʎ̥	ʎ	ʟ̥	ʟ		ʟ̠				
Lateral tap/flap									ɺ̥	ɺ			𝼈̊	𝼈		ʎ̆		ʟ̆						

		BL	LD	D	A	PA	RF	P	V	U
Implosive	Voiced	ɓ			ɗ		ᶑ	ʄ	ɠ	ʛ
Implosive	Voiceless	ɓ̥			ɗ̥		ᶑ̊	ʄ̊	ɠ̊	ʛ̥
Ejective	Stop	pʼ			tʼ		ʈʼ	cʼ	kʼ	qʼ
Ejective	Affricate		p̪fʼ	tθʼ	tsʼ	tʃʼ	tʂʼ	tɕʼ	kxʼ	qχʼ
Ejective	Fricative	ɸʼ	fʼ	θʼ	sʼ	ʃʼ	ʂʼ	ɕʼ	xʼ	χʼ
Ejective	Lateral affricate				tɬʼ			c𝼆ʼ	k𝼄ʼ	q𝼄ʼ
Ejective	Lateral fricative				ɬʼ					
Click (top: velar; bottom: uvular)	Tenuis	kʘ qʘ		kǀ qǀ	kǃ qǃ		k𝼊 q𝼊	kǂ qǂ		
Click (top: velar; bottom: uvular)	Voiced	ɡʘ ɢʘ		ɡǀ ɢǀ	ɡǃ ɢǃ		ɡ𝼊 ɢ𝼊	ɡǂ ɢǂ		
Click (top: velar; bottom: uvular)	Nasal	ŋʘ ɴʘ		ŋǀ ɴǀ	ŋǃ ɴǃ		ŋ𝼊 ɴ𝼊	ŋǂ ɴǂ	ʞ	
Click (top: velar; bottom: uvular)	Tenuis lateral				kǁ qǁ					
Click (top: velar; bottom: uvular)	Voiced lateral				ɡǁ ɢǁ					
Click (top: velar; bottom: uvular)	Nasal lateral				ŋǁ ɴǁ					
