= Open-mid front rounded vowel =

Vowel sound represented by ⟨œ⟩ in IPA

œ
- IPA number: 311

Audio sample
- source · help

Encoding
- Entity (decimal): &#339;
- Unicode (hex): U+0153
- X-SAMPA: 9
- Braille: ⠪ (braille pattern dots-246)
Image

IPA: Vowels

	Front	Central	Back
Close	i y	ɨ ʉ	ɯ u
Near-close	ɪ ʏ		ʊ
Close-mid	e ø	ɘ ɵ	ɤ o
Mid	e̞ ø̞	ə	ɤ̞ o̞
Open-mid	ɛ œ	ɜ ɞ	ʌ ɔ
Near-open	æ	ɐ
Open	a ɶ	ä	ɑ ɒ

- IPA help
- audio
- full chart
- template

Legend: unrounded • rounded

The open-mid front rounded vowel, or low-mid front rounded vowel, is a type of vowel sound, used in some spoken languages. The symbol in the International Phonetic Alphabet that represents the sound is ⟨œ⟩.

== Open-mid front compressed vowel ==
The open-mid front compressed vowel is typically transcribed in IPA simply as ⟨œ⟩, which is the convention used in this article. There is no dedicated IPA diacritic for compression. However, the compression of the lips can be shown by the letter ⟨β̞⟩ as ⟨ɛ͡β̞⟩ (simultaneous [ɛ] and labial compression) or ⟨ɛᵝ⟩ ([ɛ] modified with labial compression). The spread-lip diacritic ⟨ ͍⟩ may also be used with a rounded vowel letter ⟨œ͍⟩ as an ad hoc symbol, but 'spread' technically means unrounded.

=== Features ===
- Its vowel height is open-mid, also known as low-mid, which means the tongue is positioned halfway between an open vowel (a low vowel) and a mid vowel.
- Its vowel backness is front, which means the tongue is positioned forward in the mouth without creating a constriction that would be classified as a consonant. Rounded front vowels are often centralized, which means that often they are in fact near-front.
- Its roundedness is compressed, which means that the margins of the lips are tense and drawn together in such a way that the inner surfaces are not exposed.

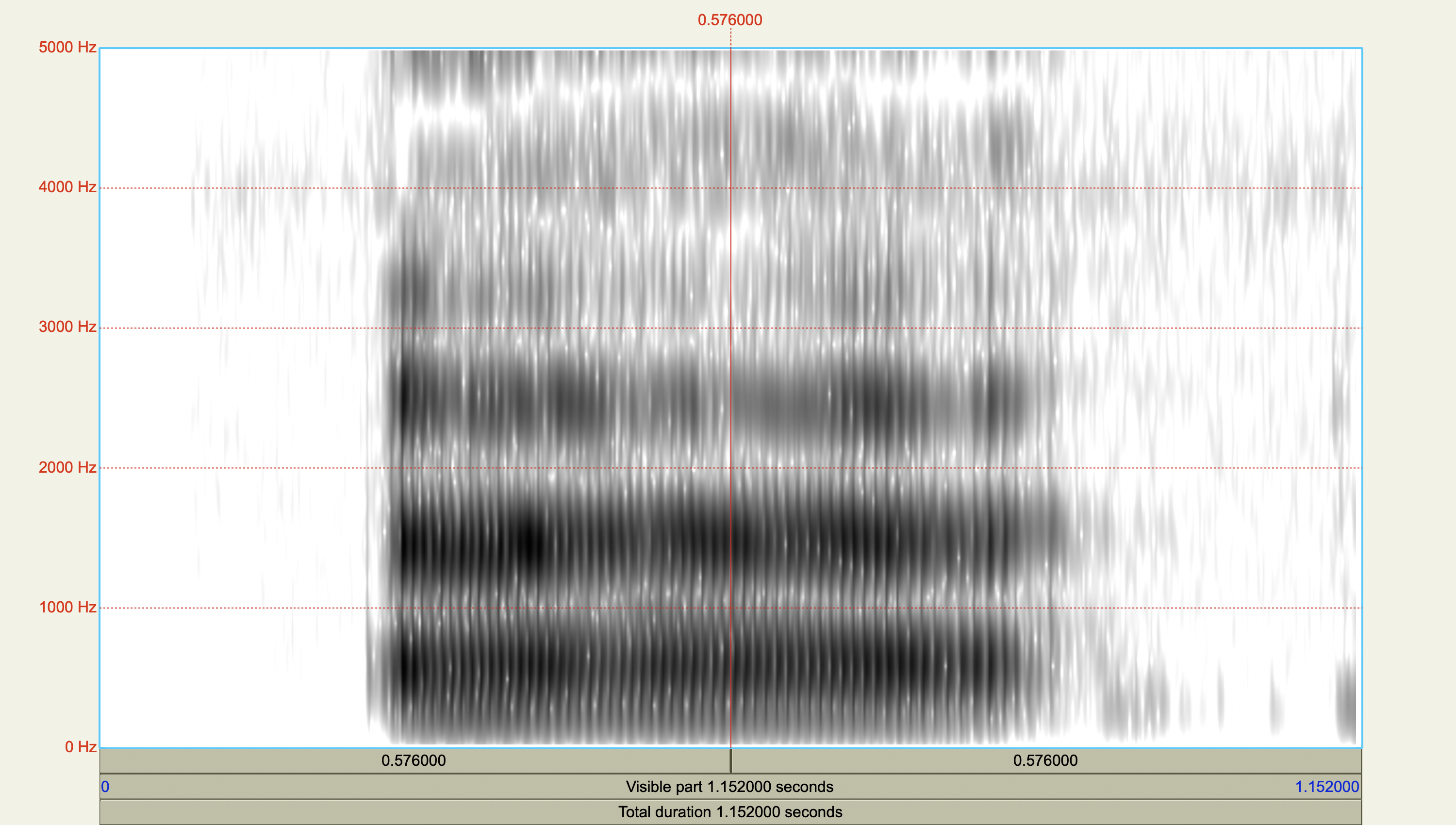
Spectrogram of [œ]

=== Occurrence ===
Because front rounded vowels are assumed to have compression, and few descriptions cover the distinction, some of the following may actually have protrusion.

Language		Word	IPA	Meaning	Notes
Asturian	Some Western dialects	fuöra	[ˈfwœɾɐ]	'outside'	Realization of ⟨o⟩ in the diphthong ⟨uo⟩. May also be realized as [ɵ] or [ø].
Azeri	North Azerbaijani	bənövşəyi	[bænœy̑ʃæji]	'purple'	
Bavarian	Amstetten dialect	Seil	[sœː]	'rope'	Contrasts close [y], near-close [ø̝], close-mid [ø] and open-mid [œ] front rounded vowels in addition to the open central unrounded [ä]. Typically transcribed in IPA with ⟨ɶ⟩.
Bavarian	Northern	I helfad	[i ˈhœlʲfɐd̥]	'I'd help'	Allophone of /ɛ/ before /l/.
Breton	All speakers	leur	[lœːr]	'floor'	Short counterpart of /øː/. May be transcribed in IPA with ⟨ø⟩.
Breton	Bas-Léon				Long; contrasts with the short open-mid /œ/ and the long close-mid /øː/. Other speakers have only one mid front rounded vowel /øː/.
Buwal		[kʷœ̄lɛ̄lɛ̄]		'fine'	Allophone of /a/ when adjacent to a labialized consonant.
Chinese	Cantonese	長 / cheung4	[tsʰœːŋ˩]	'long'	See Cantonese phonology
Lombard	Lombard	fiœ	[fjœː]	'boy','man'	Occurs naturally in the language, most frequently in western and northern regions, alternating with ø in many words, and rendered under the letter 'œ', while [ø] is under the letter ö.
Danish	Standard	gøre	[ˈkœːɐ]	'to do'	Typically transcribed with ⟨œ̞⟩, where ⟨œ⟩ instead represents mid [œ̝]. See Danish phonology
Dutch	Standard	manoeuvre	[maˈnœːvrə]	'manoeuvre'	Occurs only in a few loanwords. See Dutch phonology
Dutch	Some speakers	parfum	[pɑrˈfœ̃ː]	'perfume'	Nasalized; occurs only in a few loanwords and it is used mainly in southern accents. Often nativized as [ʏm]. See Dutch phonology
Dutch	The Hague dialect	uit	[œːt]	'out'	Corresponds to [œy] in standard Dutch. See Dutch phonology
English	General New Zealand	bird	[bœːd]	'bird'	May be mid [œ̝ː] instead, or close-mid [øː] in broader varieties. Typically transcribed in IPA with ⟨ɵː⟩. See New Zealand English phonology
English	Scouse	bird	[bœːd]	'bird'	Possible realization of the merged SQUARE–NURSE vowel /eː/.
English	Southern Welsh	bird	[bœːd]	'bird'	Also described as mid [œ̝ː] and close-mid [øː].
English	General South African	go	[ɡœː]	'go'	Some speakers. Can be a diphthong of the type [œʉ̯]~[œɘ̯] instead. Other South African varieties do not monophthongize. See South African English phonology
French		jeune	[ʒœn]	'young'	See French phonology
Galician		semana	[s̺œˈmãnɐ̃]	ˈweek'	Labialization of pre-tonic [e], which is usually realized as [o]
German	Standard	Hölle	[ˈhœlə]	'hell'	See Standard German phonology
German	Western Swiss accents	schön	[ʃœːn]	'beautiful'	Close-mid [øː] in other accents. See Standard German phonology
Limburgish	Many dialects	mäö	[mœː]	'sleeve'	Central [ɞː] in Maastricht; the example word is from the Hasselt dialect.
Low German		söss / zös	[zœs]	'six'	
Low German	Espírito Santo East Pomeranian	[ˈhœɫ]		'hell'	
Saterland Frisian		bölkje	[ˈbœlkjə]	'to rear'	
Turkish	Istanbul	köz	[ˈcœz]	'fire'	Corresponds to [ø̞] in standard Turkish. See Turkish phonology.
West Frisian	Hindeloopers				See West Frisian phonology
West Frisian	Súdwesthoeksk	skoalle	[ˈskœlə]	'school'	See West Frisian phonology

== Open-mid front protruded vowel ==
Open-mid front protruded vowel

œ̫

Catford notes that most languages with rounded front and back vowels use distinct types of labialization, protruded back vowels and compressed front vowels. However, a few, such as Scandinavian languages, have protruded front vowels. One Scandinavian language, Swedish, even contrasts the two types of rounding in front vowels (see near-close front rounded vowel, with Swedish examples of both types of rounding).

As there are no diacritics in the IPA to distinguish protruded and compressed rounding, an old diacritic for labialization, ⟨ ̫⟩, will be used here as an ad hoc symbol for protruded front vowels. Another possible transcription is ⟨œʷ⟩ or ⟨ɛʷ⟩ (an open-mid front vowel modified by endolabialization), but it could be misread as a diphthong.

Acoustically, the sound is "between" the more typical compressed open-mid front vowel [œ] and the unrounded open-mid front vowel [ɛ].

=== Features ===
- Its vowel height is open-mid, also known as low-mid, which means the tongue is positioned halfway between an open vowel (a low vowel) and a mid vowel.
- Its vowel backness is front, which means the tongue is positioned forward in the mouth without creating a constriction that would be classified as a consonant. Rounded front vowels are often centralized, which means that often they are in fact near-front.
- Its roundedness is protruded, which means that the corners of the lips are drawn together, and the inner surfaces exposed.

=== Occurrence ===
Language		Word	IPA	Meaning	Notes
Norwegian		nøtt	[nœ̫tː]	'nut'	The example word is from Urban East Norwegian, in which the vowel has also been described as mid central [ɞ̝]. See Norwegian phonology
Swedish	Central Standard	öra	[²œ̫ːra̠]	'ear'	Allophone of /øː/ and also sometimes /œ/ before /r/, and according to older accounts before /m, n/ and less often after /r/. Riad (2014) describe an even more open allophone in younger speakers [ɶ, ɶː] whilst Persson (2024)'s chats point to open-mid central allophones [œ̈, œ̈ː]. See Swedish phonology
Swedish	Stockholm, Linköping, and Lund	höna	[²hœ̫ːna̠]	'hen'	Engstrand (1990) reported the phonemes /œ øː/ and placed the short variant at mid height, as in [œ̝᫇]. According to Pelzer & Boersma (2019), the long vowel has been lowered to open-mid [œ̫ː] in Linköping and Lund, and near-open [œ̞᫇ː] in Stockholm, with the recommendation of transcribing the phoneme as /œː/ instead of /øː/. An earlier study from the same authors found that the vowel moves slightly lower and more central during its pronunciation in Stockholm and Linköping, while it moves slightly higher in Lund. Persson (2024) reports both short and long variants as allophones of the phonemes /ø øː/, lowered before /r/ and any retroflex segment; long [øː œː] are marked as 'lower-mid' and short [ø œ] are marked as 'mid-high', each pairing being differentiated primarily by formant acoustics other than height, and all as central rather than front. See Swedish phonology

== Notes ==
Place →	Labial					Coronal										Dorsal					Laryngeal			
Manner ↓	Bilabial		Labiodental		Linguolabial		Dental		Alveolar		Postalveolar		Retroflex		(Alveolo-)palatal		Velar		Uvular		Pharyngeal/epiglottal		Glottal	
Nasal	m̥	m	ɱ̊	ɱ		n̼	n̪̊	n̪	n̥	n	n̠̊	n̠	ɳ̊	ɳ	ɲ̊	ɲ	ŋ̊	ŋ	ɴ̥	ɴ				
Plosive	p	b	p̪	b̪	t̼	d̼	t̪	d̪	t	d			ʈ	ɖ	c	ɟ	k	ɡ	q	ɢ	ʡ		ʔ	
Sibilant affricate							t̪s̪	d̪z̪	ts	dz	t̠ʃ	d̠ʒ	tʂ	dʐ	tɕ	dʑ								
Non-sibilant affricate	pɸ	bβ	p̪f	b̪v			t̪θ	d̪ð	tɹ̝̊	dɹ̝	t̠ɹ̠̊˔	d̠ɹ̠˔			cç	ɟʝ	kx	ɡɣ	qχ	ɢʁ	ʡʜ	ʡʢ	ʔh	
Sibilant fricative							s̪	z̪	s	z	ʃ	ʒ	ʂ	ʐ	ɕ	ʑ								
Non-sibilant fricative	ɸ	β	f	v	θ̼	ð̼	θ	ð	θ̠	ð̠	ɹ̠̊˔	ɹ̠˔	ɻ̊˔	ɻ˔	ç	ʝ	x	ɣ	χ	ʁ	ħ	ʕ	h	ɦ
Approximant		β̞		ʋ				ð̞		ɹ		ɹ̠		ɻ		j		ɰ						˷
Tap/flap		ⱱ̟		ⱱ					ɾ̥	ɾ			ɽ̊	ɽ						ɢ̆		ʡ̆		
Trill	ʙ̥	ʙ							r̥	r		r̠	ɽ̊r̥	ɽr					ʀ̥	ʀ	ʜ	ʢ		
Lateral affricate									tɬ	dɮ			tꞎ	d𝼅	c𝼆	ɟʎ̝	k𝼄	ɡʟ̝						
Lateral fricative							ɬ̪		ɬ	ɮ			ꞎ	𝼅	𝼆	ʎ̝	𝼄	ʟ̝						
Lateral approximant								l̪	l̥	l		l̠	ɭ̊	ɭ	ʎ̥	ʎ	ʟ̥	ʟ		ʟ̠				
Lateral tap/flap									ɺ̥	ɺ			𝼈̊	𝼈		ʎ̆		ʟ̆						

		BL	LD	D	A	PA	RF	P	V	U
Implosive	Voiced	ɓ			ɗ		ᶑ	ʄ	ɠ	ʛ
Implosive	Voiceless	ɓ̥			ɗ̥		ᶑ̊	ʄ̊	ɠ̊	ʛ̥
Ejective	Stop	pʼ			tʼ		ʈʼ	cʼ	kʼ	qʼ
Ejective	Affricate		p̪fʼ	t̪θʼ	tsʼ	t̠ʃʼ	tʂʼ	tɕʼ	kxʼ	qχʼ
Ejective	Fricative	ɸʼ	fʼ	θʼ	sʼ	ʃʼ	ʂʼ	ɕʼ	xʼ	χʼ
Ejective	Lateral affricate				tɬʼ			c𝼆ʼ	k𝼄ʼ	q𝼄ʼ
Ejective	Lateral fricative				ɬʼ					
Click (top: velar; bottom: uvular)	Tenuis	kʘ qʘ		kǀ qǀ	kǃ qǃ		k𝼊 q𝼊	kǂ qǂ		
Click (top: velar; bottom: uvular)	Voiced	ɡʘ ɢʘ		ɡǀ ɢǀ	ɡǃ ɢǃ		ɡ𝼊 ɢ𝼊	ɡǂ ɢǂ		
Click (top: velar; bottom: uvular)	Nasal	ŋʘ ɴʘ		ŋǀ ɴǀ	ŋǃ ɴǃ		ŋ𝼊 ɴ𝼊	ŋǂ ɴǂ	ʞ	
Click (top: velar; bottom: uvular)	Tenuis lateral				kǁ qǁ					
Click (top: velar; bottom: uvular)	Voiced lateral				ɡǁ ɢǁ					
Click (top: velar; bottom: uvular)	Nasal lateral				ŋǁ ɴǁ					
