= Close-mid central unrounded vowel =

Vowel sound represented by ⟨ɘ⟩ in IPA

ɘ
- IPA number: 397

Audio sample
- source · help

Encoding
- Entity (decimal): &#600;
- Unicode (hex): U+0258
- X-SAMPA: @\
- Braille: ⠲ (braille pattern dots-256) ⠑ (braille pattern dots-15)
Image

IPA: Vowels

	Front	Central	Back
Close	i y	ɨ ʉ	ɯ u
Near-close	ɪ ʏ		ʊ
Close-mid	e ø	ɘ ɵ	ɤ o
Mid	e̞ ø̞	ə	ɤ̞ o̞
Open-mid	ɛ œ	ɜ ɞ	ʌ ɔ
Near-open	æ	ɐ
Open	a ɶ	ä	ɑ ɒ

- IPA help
- audio
- full chart
- template

Legend: unrounded • rounded

The close-mid central unrounded vowel, or high-mid central unrounded vowel, is a type of vowel sound used in some spoken languages. The symbol in the International Phonetic Alphabet that represents this sound is ⟨ɘ⟩. This is a mirrored letter e and should not be confused with the schwa ⟨ə⟩, which is a turned e. It was added to the IPA in 1993; before that, this vowel was transcribed ⟨ë⟩. Certain older sources transcribe this vowel ⟨ɤ̈⟩.

The letter ⟨ɘ⟩ may be used with a lowering diacritic ⟨ɘ̞⟩, to denote the mid central unrounded vowel.

== Features ==
- Its vowel height is close-mid, also known as high-mid, which means the tongue is positioned halfway between a close vowel (a high vowel) and a mid vowel.
- Its vowel backness is central, which means the tongue is positioned halfway between a front vowel and a back vowel.
- It is unrounded, which means that the lips are not rounded.

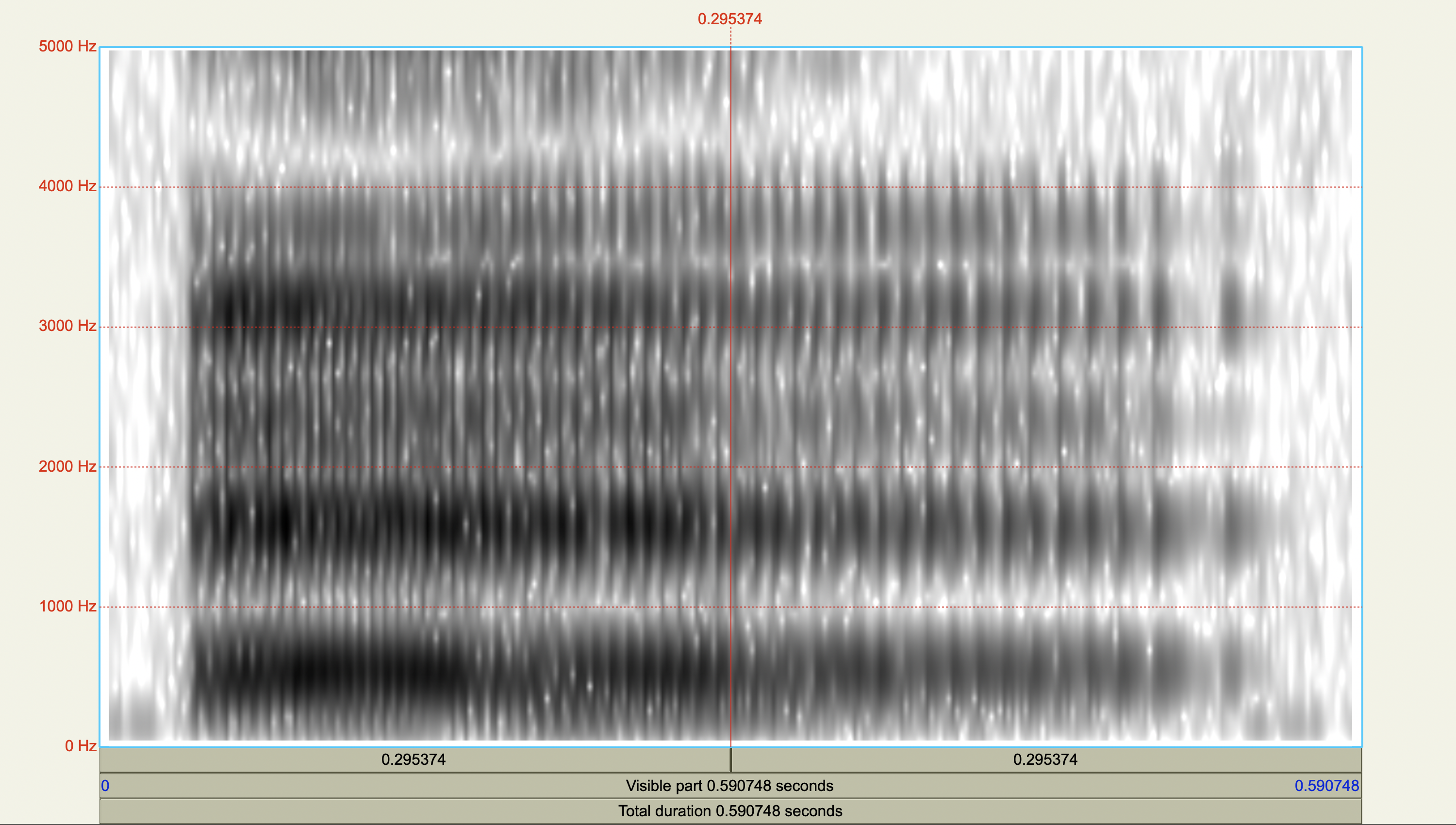
Spectrogram of [ɘ]

== Occurrence ==
Language		Word	IPA	Meaning	Notes
Chuvash		пӗррехинче	[pɘrrɛχint͡ɕɛ]	'once'	
Cotabato Manobo					May be transcribed in IPA with ⟨ə⟩.
Dinka	Luanyjang	ŋeŋ	[ŋɘ́ŋ]	'jawbone'	Short allophone of /e/.
English	Australian	bird	[bɘːd]	'bird'	Typically transcribed in IPA with ⟨ɜː⟩. Optionally rounded. See Australian English phonology
English	Cardiff	foot	[fɘt]	'foot'	Less often rounded [ɵ]; corresponds to [ʊ] in other dialects. See English phonology
English	New Zealand	bit	[bɘt]	'bit'	Merger of /ə/ and /ɪ/ found in other dialects. See New Zealand English phonology
English	Southern American	nut	[nɘt]	'nut'	Some dialects. Corresponds to /ʌ/ in other dialects. See English phonology
Estonian		kõrv	[kɘrv]	'ear'	Typically transcribed in IPA with ⟨ɤ⟩; can be close-mid back [ɤ] or close back [ɯ] instead, depending on the speaker. See Estonian phonology
Irish	Munster	sáile	[ˈsˠɰaːlʲə̝]	'salt water'	Usually transcribed in IPA with [ɪ̽]. It is an allophone of /ə/ next to non-palatal slender consonants. See Irish phonology
Jebero		ɨx[e/ï][k/c/q]	[ˈiʃɘk]	'bat'	
Kaingang		me	[ˈᵐbɘ]	'tail'	Varies between central [ɘ] and back [ɤ].
Kalagan Kaagan		[miˈwə̝ːʔ]		'lost'	Allophone of /ɨ/ in word-final stressed syllables before /ʔ/; can be transcribed in IPA with ⟨ə⟩.
Katë		Katë	[kaˈt̪ɘ]	'Katë'	Can also be realized as /ɨ/.
Kazakh		тілі / tılı	[tʰɘˈlɘ]	'language'	
Kensiu		[ɟɚ̝h]		'to trim'	Rhotacized; may be transcribed in IPA with ⟨ɚ⟩.
Kera		[t͡ʃə̝̄wā̠a̠]		'fire'	Allophone of /a/; typically transcribed in IPA with ⟨ə⟩.
Korean		어른/eoreun	[ə̝ːɾɯ̽n]	'adult'	May be transcribed in IPA with ⟨əː⟩. See Korean phonology
Kurdish	Kurmanji	dil/دل	[dɘl]	'heart'	Allophone of /ɪ/. Sorani alphabet does not transcribe this vowel phoneme in text.
Kurdish	Sorani	dil/دل	[dɘl]	'heart'	Allophone of /ɪ/. Sorani alphabet does not transcribe this vowel phoneme in text.
Lizu		[^{F}kə̝]		'eagle'	Allophone of /ə/ after velar stops.
Mapudungun		elün	[ë̝ˈlɘn]	'to give (something)'	
Mongolian		үсэр	[usɘɾɘ̆]	'jump'	
Mono		dœ	[də̝]	'be (equative)'	May be transcribed in IPA with ⟨ə⟩.
Polish		mysz	[mɘ̟ʂ]	'mouse'	Somewhat fronted; typically transcribed in IPA with ⟨ɨ⟩. See Polish phonology
Romanian	Moldavian dialect	casă	[ˈkäsɘ]	'house'	Corresponds to [ə] in standard Romanian. See Romanian phonology
Scottish Gaelic	Harris	bhuaipe	[ˈvuɘhpə]	'from her'	Allophone of /e/ in the diphthong /ue/, which in other dialects is /uə/ or /uæ/. May be closer as [ɨ̞].
Scottish Gaelic	Uist	bhuaipe	[ˈvuɘhpə]	'from her'	Allophone of /e/ in the diphthong /ue/, which in other dialects is /uə/ or /uæ/. May be closer as [ɨ̞].
Shiwiar					
Temne		pər	[pə̝́r]	'incite'	Typically transcribed in IPA with ⟨ə⟩.
Vietnamese		vợ	[vɘ˨˩ˀ]	'wife'	Typically transcribed in IPA with ⟨ɤ⟩. See Vietnamese phonology
Xumi	Upper	[LPmɘ̃dɐ]		'upstairs'	Nasalized; occurs only in this word. It is realized as mid [ə̃] in Lower Xumi.
Zapotec	Tilquiapan	ne	[nɘ]	'and'	Most common realization of /e/.

== Notes ==
Place →	Labial					Coronal										Dorsal					Laryngeal			
Manner ↓	Bilabial		Labiodental		Linguolabial		Dental		Alveolar		Postalveolar		Retroflex		(Alveolo-)palatal		Velar		Uvular		Pharyngeal/epiglottal		Glottal	
Nasal	m̥	m	ɱ̊	ɱ		n̼	n̪̊	n̪	n̥	n	n̠̊	n̠	ɳ̊	ɳ	ɲ̊	ɲ	ŋ̊	ŋ	ɴ̥	ɴ				
Plosive	p	b	p̪	b̪	t̼	d̼	t̪	d̪	t	d			ʈ	ɖ	c	ɟ	k	ɡ	q	ɢ	ʡ		ʔ	
Sibilant affricate							t̪s̪	d̪z̪	ts	dz	t̠ʃ	d̠ʒ	tʂ	dʐ	tɕ	dʑ								
Non-sibilant affricate	pɸ	bβ	p̪f	b̪v			t̪θ	d̪ð	tɹ̝̊	dɹ̝	t̠ɹ̠̊˔	d̠ɹ̠˔			cç	ɟʝ	kx	ɡɣ	qχ	ɢʁ	ʡʜ	ʡʢ	ʔh	
Sibilant fricative							s̪	z̪	s	z	ʃ	ʒ	ʂ	ʐ	ɕ	ʑ								
Non-sibilant fricative	ɸ	β	f	v	θ̼	ð̼	θ	ð	θ̠	ð̠	ɹ̠̊˔	ɹ̠˔	ɻ̊˔	ɻ˔	ç	ʝ	x	ɣ	χ	ʁ	ħ	ʕ	h	ɦ
Approximant		β̞		ʋ				ð̞		ɹ		ɹ̠		ɻ		j		ɰ						˷
Tap/flap		ⱱ̟		ⱱ					ɾ̥	ɾ			ɽ̊	ɽ						ɢ̆		ʡ̆		
Trill	ʙ̥	ʙ							r̥	r		r̠	ɽ̊r̥	ɽr					ʀ̥	ʀ	ʜ	ʢ		
Lateral affricate									tɬ	dɮ			tꞎ	d𝼅	c𝼆	ɟʎ̝	k𝼄	ɡʟ̝						
Lateral fricative							ɬ̪		ɬ	ɮ			ꞎ	𝼅	𝼆	ʎ̝	𝼄	ʟ̝						
Lateral approximant								l̪	l̥	l		l̠	ɭ̊	ɭ	ʎ̥	ʎ	ʟ̥	ʟ		ʟ̠				
Lateral tap/flap									ɺ̥	ɺ			𝼈̊	𝼈		ʎ̆		ʟ̆						

		BL	LD	D	A	PA	RF	P	V	U
Implosive	Voiced	ɓ			ɗ		ᶑ	ʄ	ɠ	ʛ
Implosive	Voiceless	ɓ̥			ɗ̥		ᶑ̊	ʄ̊	ɠ̊	ʛ̥
Ejective	Stop	pʼ			tʼ		ʈʼ	cʼ	kʼ	qʼ
Ejective	Affricate		p̪fʼ	tθʼ	tsʼ	tʃʼ	tʂʼ	tɕʼ	kxʼ	qχʼ
Ejective	Fricative	ɸʼ	fʼ	θʼ	sʼ	ʃʼ	ʂʼ	ɕʼ	xʼ	χʼ
Ejective	Lateral affricate				tɬʼ			c𝼆ʼ	k𝼄ʼ	q𝼄ʼ
Ejective	Lateral fricative				ɬʼ					
Click (top: velar; bottom: uvular)	Tenuis	kʘ qʘ		kǀ qǀ	kǃ qǃ		k𝼊 q𝼊	kǂ qǂ		
Click (top: velar; bottom: uvular)	Voiced	ɡʘ ɢʘ		ɡǀ ɢǀ	ɡǃ ɢǃ		ɡ𝼊 ɢ𝼊	ɡǂ ɢǂ		
Click (top: velar; bottom: uvular)	Nasal	ŋʘ ɴʘ		ŋǀ ɴǀ	ŋǃ ɴǃ		ŋ𝼊 ɴ𝼊	ŋǂ ɴǂ	ʞ	
Click (top: velar; bottom: uvular)	Tenuis lateral				kǁ qǁ					
Click (top: velar; bottom: uvular)	Voiced lateral				ɡǁ ɢǁ					
Click (top: velar; bottom: uvular)	Nasal lateral				ŋǁ ɴǁ					
