= Near-close near-front rounded vowel =

Vowel sound represented by ⟨ʏ⟩ in IPA

ʏ
- IPA number: 320

Audio sample
- source · help

Encoding
- Entity (decimal): &#655;
- Unicode (hex): U+028F
- X-SAMPA: Y
- Braille: ⠔ (braille pattern dots-35) ⠽ (braille pattern dots-13456)
Image

IPA: Vowels

	Front	Central	Back
Close	i y	ɨ ʉ	ɯ u
Near-close	ɪ ʏ		ʊ
Close-mid	e ø	ɘ ɵ	ɤ o
Mid	e̞ ø̞	ə	ɤ̞ o̞
Open-mid	ɛ œ	ɜ ɞ	ʌ ɔ
Near-open	æ	ɐ
Open	a ɶ	ä	ɑ ɒ

- IPA help
- audio
- full chart
- template

Legend: unrounded • rounded

The near-close near-front rounded vowel, or near-high near-front rounded vowel, is a type of vowel sound, used in some spoken languages. The symbol in the International Phonetic Alphabet that represents this sound is ⟨ʏ⟩ (a small capital Latin letter Y).

The Handbook of the International Phonetic Association defines [ʏ] as a mid-centralized (lowered and centralized) close front rounded vowel (transcribed [y̽] or [ÿ˕]), and the current official IPA name of the vowel transcribed with the symbol ⟨ʏ⟩ is a near-close near-front rounded vowel.

However, some languages have a vowel that is somewhat lower than the canonical value of [ʏ], though it still fits the definition of a mid-centralized [y]. It occurs in German Standard German as well as some dialects of English (such as Estuary). It can be narrowly transcribed with [ʏ̞] (a lowered ⟨ʏ⟩), [ø̠] (a backed ⟨ø⟩), or [ɵ̟] (a fronted ⟨ɵ⟩). For precision, this can be described as a close-mid near-front rounded vowel.

Additionally, in many languages that contrast close, near-close, and close-mid front rounded vowels, there is no appreciable difference in backness between them. In some transcriptions, the vowel is transcribed with ⟨y⟩ or ⟨ø⟩. When that is the case, this article uses the narrow transcriptions [y˕] (a lowered ⟨y⟩) and [ø̝] (a raised ⟨ø⟩), respectively. For precision, this can be described as a near-close front rounded vowel, or near-high front rounded vowel, which may also be represented with [ʏ̟] (a fronted ⟨ʏ⟩). Some phoneticians argue that all lip position inverses of the primary cardinal vowels are centralized (with the exception of ⟨ɒ⟩) based on formant acoustics, so that there may be no substantial difference between a near-close near-front rounded vowel [ʏ] and its fully front counterpart [y˕].

⟨ʏ⟩ implies too weak a rounding in some cases (specifically in the case of the vowels that are described as tense in Germanic languages, which are typically transcribed with [øː]), which would have to be specified as [ʏ̹]. In most languages, the rounded vowel is pronounced with compressed lips (in an exolabial manner). However, in a few cases, the lips are protruded (in an endolabial manner), such as in Swedish, which contrasts the two types of rounding.

== Transcription ==
The near-close front rounded vowel is transcribed with ⟨y⟩, ⟨ʏ⟩ and ⟨ø⟩ in world's languages. However, when the Latin ⟨y⟩ or ⟨ø⟩ are used for this vowel, ⟨ʏ⟩ may still be used for phonological reasons for a vowel that is lower than near-close, potentially leading to confusion. This is the case in several Germanic language varieties, as well as in some transcriptions of Shanghainese.

In the following table, the difference between compressed and protruded vowels is ignored, except in the case of Swedish. Short vowels transcribed with ⟨ʉ⟩, ⟨ʏ⟩, ⟨ɵ⟩ and ⟨œ⟩ in broad transcription are assumed to have a weak rounding in most cases.

Symbol	Phonetic values in various language varieties									
Symbol	Dutch	Dzongkha	Frisian languages		German	Limburgish			Shanghainese	Swedish
Symbol	Dutch	Dzongkha	Fering	Saterland	Northern Standard	Hamont-Achel	Maastricht	Weert	Shanghainese	Central Standard
⟨y⟩	[y] ~ [ʏ] ~ [ʉ]	—N/a	—N/a	[y]	[y]	[ʉ̞]	[ʉ]	[y]	—N/a	same as ⟨ʏ⟩
⟨yː⟩	[yː] ~ [ʏː] ~ [ʉː]	[yː] ~ [ʏː]	[yː]	[yː]	[yː]	[yː]	[ʉː]	[yː]	—N/a	[y̫ː]
⟨ʉ⟩	same as ⟨ʏ⟩	—N/a	—N/a	—N/a	—N/a	—N/a	—N/a	—N/a	—N/a	[ʉ̞ᵝ]
⟨ʉː⟩	—N/a	—N/a	—N/a	—N/a	—N/a	—N/a	—N/a	—N/a	—N/a	[ʏᵝː] ~ [yᵝː]
⟨ʏ⟩	[ɵ]	—N/a	[ʉ̞]	[ø]	[ø̜]	[ɵ]	[ɵ]	[ɵ]	[ø]	[ø̫] ~ [ʏ̫] ~ [y̫]
⟨ø⟩	same as ⟨øː⟩	—N/a	—N/a	—N/a	[ø̹]	same as ⟨øː⟩	same as ⟨øː⟩	same as ⟨øː⟩	[ʏ]	same as ⟨œ⟩
⟨øː⟩	[øʏ] ~ [øː] ~ [ɵː]	[øː] ~ [œː]	[ʉ̞ː]	[ʏː]	[ø̹ː]	[ɵː]	[ɵː] ~ [ɵʊ̈]	[øə]	—N/a	[ø̫ː]
⟨ɵ⟩	same as ⟨ʏ⟩	—N/a	—N/a	—N/a	—N/a	—N/a	—N/a	—N/a	—N/a	[ɵ̞ᵝ]
⟨œ⟩	same as ⟨ʏ⟩	—N/a	[ɵ]	[œ]	[œ]	[œ]	[œ̝]	[œ̝]	—N/a	[œ̫˔]
⟨œː⟩	[œː]	—N/a	—N/a	[øː]	[œː]	[œː]	[ɞː]	[œ̝ː]	—N/a	—N/a

== Near-close front compressed vowel ==
The near-close front compressed vowel is typically transcribed in IPA simply as ⟨ʏ⟩, and that is the convention used in this article. There is no dedicated diacritic for compression in the IPA. However, the compression of the lips can be shown with the letter ⟨β̞⟩ as ⟨ɪ͡β̞⟩ (simultaneous [ɪ] and labial compression) or ⟨ɪᵝ⟩ ([ɪ] modified with labial compression). The spread-lip diacritic ⟨ ͍⟩ may also be used with a rounded vowel letter ⟨ʏ͍⟩ as an ad hoc symbol, though technically 'spread' means unrounded.

The close-mid front compressed vowel can be transcribed ⟨ɪ̞͡β̞⟩, ⟨ɪ̞ᵝ⟩ or ⟨ʏ͍˕⟩.

=== Features ===
- Its vowel height is near-close, also known as near-high, which means the tongue is not quite so constricted as a close vowel (high vowel).
- Its vowel backness is front, which means the tongue is positioned forward in the mouth without creating a constriction that would be classified as a consonant. Rounded front vowels are often centralized, which means that often they are in fact near-front.
- Its roundedness is compressed, which means that the margins of the lips are tense and drawn together in such a way that the inner surfaces are not exposed. The prototypical [ʏ] has a weak compressed rounding, more like [œ] than the neighboring cardinal vowels.

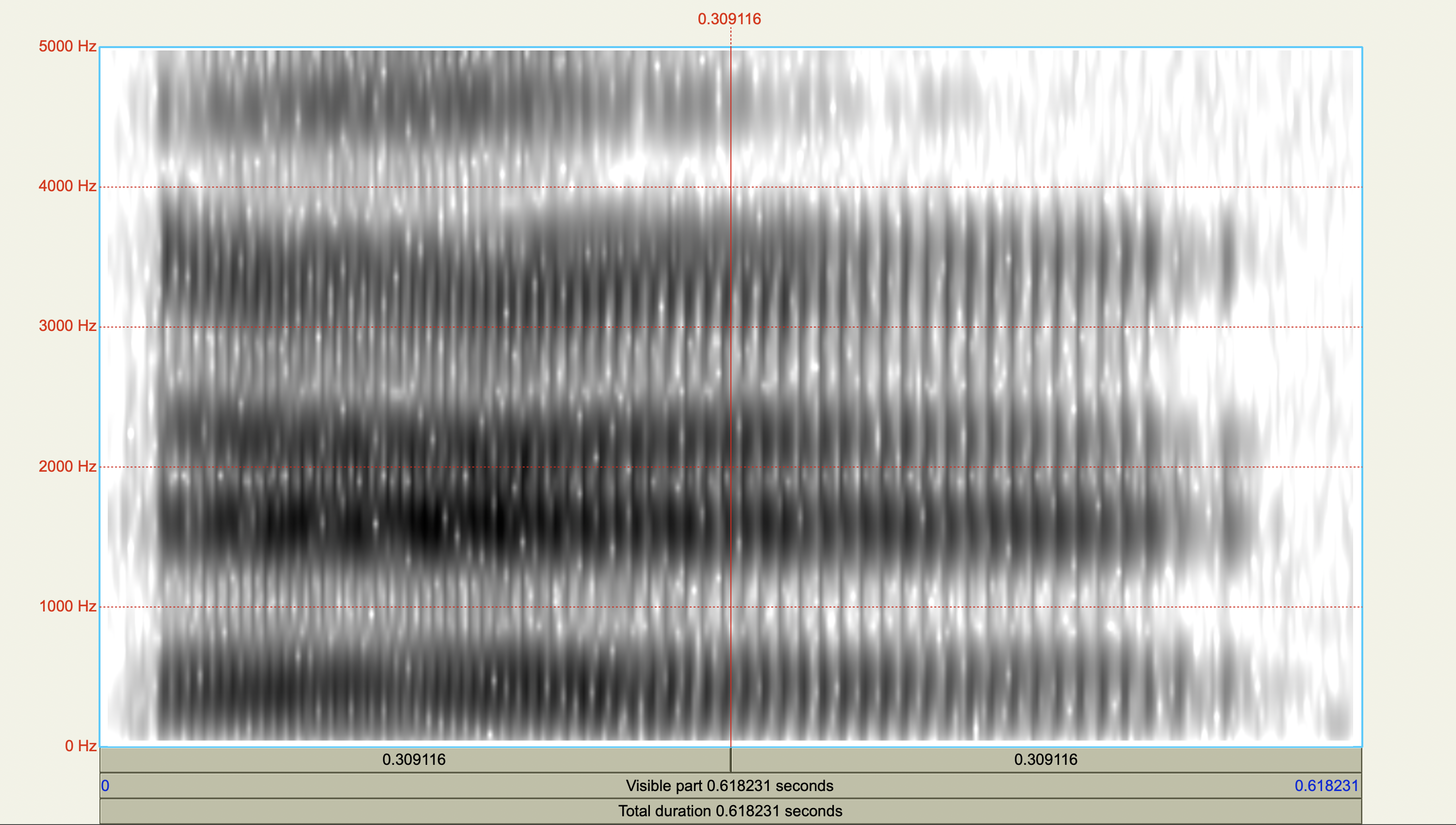
Spectrogram of [ʏ]

=== Occurrence ===
Because front rounded vowels are assumed to have compression, and few descriptions cover the distinction, some of the following may actually have protrusion. Vowels transcribed with ⟨y˕⟩ and ⟨ø̝⟩ may have a stronger rounding than the prototypical value of ⟨ʏ⟩.

Language		Word	IPA	Meaning	Notes
Albanian	Gheg	yll	[ʏɫ]	'star'	
Armenian	Western	հիւր	[hʏɾ]	'guest'	
Bashkir		өс/üs /أوس (historically)	[ʏs]	'three'	Close-mid. Also realized as a near-close front vowel.
Bavarian	Northern	vill	[v̥ʏl]	'much'	Allophone of /i/ before /l/.
Buwal		[ɗɛ́ɗʏ̄wɛ̄k]		'bitter'	Palatalized allophone of /ə/ when adjacent to a labialized consonant.
Chinese	Shanghainese	肝 / koe	[kø̝˩]	'liver'	Realization of /ø/ in open syllables and /ʏ/ in closed syllables. Near-close [ø̝] in the former case, close-mid [ʏ̞] in the latter.
Danish	Standard	købe	[ˈkʰø̝ːpə]	'buy'	Also described as close-mid [øː]. See Danish phonology
Dutch	Standard	nu	[nʏ˕]	'now'	Also transcribed as close front [y] and, in the Standard Northern accent, as close central [ʉ]. Typically transcribed in IPA with ⟨y⟩. See Dutch phonology
English	Estuary	foot	[fʏʔt]	'foot'	Possible realization of /ʊ/ and /uː/. In the former case, the height varies between near-close [ʏ] and close-mid [ʏ̞].
English	Multicultural London	foot	[fʏʔt]	'foot'	Possible realization of /ʊ/.
English	Rural white Southern American	foot	[fʏt̚]	'foot'	Can be central [ʊ̈] instead.
English	West Country	foot	[fʏt]	'foot'	Possible realization of /ʊ/ and /uː/.
English	New Zealand	nurse	[nʏːs]	'nurse'	Possible realization of /ɵː/ (and also /ʉː/). See New Zealand English phonology
English	Ulster	mule	[mjʏl]	'mule'	Short allophone of /u/; occurs only after /j/. See English phonology
English	Multicultural London	food	[fʏːd]	'food'	
Faroese		krúss	[kɹʏsː]	'mug'	See Faroese phonology
French	Parisian	tu	[t̪ʏ˕]	'you'	Also described as close [y]; typically transcribed in IPA with ⟨y⟩. See French phonology
French	Quebec	lune	[lʏn]	'moon'	Allophone of /y/ in closed syllables. See Quebec French phonology
German	Standard	schützen	[ˈʃʏ̞t͡sn̩]	'protect'	Close-mid; it may be as high as [y] for some speakers. See Standard German phonology
German	Some speakers	schwimmen	[ʃvʏmː]	'to swim'	Allophone of /ɪ/ before labial consonants. Used by some speakers in Northern and Central Germany. See Standard German phonology
Hungarian		üt	[y˕t̪]	'hit'	Typically transcribed in IPA with ⟨y⟩. See Hungarian phonology
Icelandic		vinur	[ˈʋɪ̞ːnʏ̞ɾ]	'friend'	Close-mid; also described as central [ɵ]. See Icelandic phonology
Kazakh		жүр/jür /ٴجۇر	[ʑʏr]	'go'	
Kurdish		dwênê دوێنێ	[dʏneː]	'yesterday'	Allophone of /weː/ before consonant.
Low German		lütt / lut	[lʏt]	'little'	
Norwegian		nytt	[nʏtː]	'new'	The example word is from Urban East Norwegian, in which the vowel varies between compressed [ʏ] and protruded [ʏ̫]. Its height has been variously described as near-close [ʏ] and close [y]. See Norwegian phonology.
Saterland Frisian		röögje	[ˈʀø̝ːɡjə]	'to rain'	Phonetic realization of /øː/ and /ʏ/. Near-close [ø̝ː] in the former case, close-mid [ʏ̞] in the latter. Phonetically, the latter is nearly identical to /œː/ ([øː]).
Scots		buit	[bʏt]	'boot'	May be central [ʉ] instead.
Scottish Gaelic	Colonsay	adharc	[ˈʏʔʏɾ̥ɡ̥]	'horn'	Roughly corresponds to [ɤ] and [ɯ] in most other dialects. Can be [y] or [ø] instead.
Scottish Gaelic	Islay	adharc	[ˈʏʔʏɾ̥ɡ̥]	'horn'	Roughly corresponds to [ɤ] and [ɯ] in most other dialects. Can be [y] or [ø] instead.
Swedish	Central Standard	ut	[ʏːt̪]	'out'	Often realized as a sequence [ʏβ̞] or [ʏβ] (hear the word: [ʏβt̪]). The height has been variously described as near-close [ʏː] and close [yː]. Typically transcribed in IPA with ⟨ʉː⟩; it is central [ʉː] in other dialects. See Swedish phonology
Turkish		atasözü	[ät̪äˈs̪ø̞z̪ʏ]	'proverb'	Allophone of /y/ described variously as "word-final" and "occurring in final open syllable of a phrase". See Turkish phonology
Turkmen		Türkmençe تۊرکمینچی	[tʏɾkmøntʃø]	'Turkmen'	
West Frisian		nut	[nʏt]	'utility'	Also realized as [ɵ]. See West Frisian phonology
Wymysorys		büwa	[ˈbʏvä]	'boys'	

== Near-close front protruded vowel ==
Near-close front protruded vowel

ʏ̫

Catford notes that most languages with rounded front and back vowels use distinct types of labialization, protruded back vowels and compressed front vowels. However, a few languages, such as Scandinavian languages, have protruded front vowels. One of them, Swedish, even contrasts the two types of rounding in front vowels as well as height and duration.

As there are no diacritics in the IPA to distinguish protruded and compressed rounding, the old diacritic for labialization, ⟨◌̫⟩, will be used here as an ad hoc symbol for protruded front vowels. Another possible transcription is [ʏʷ] or [ɪʷ] (a near-close front vowel modified by endolabialization), but that could be misread as a diphthong.

A close-mid (near-)front protruded vowel may be narrowly transcribed with [ʏ̫˕], [ʏ̞ʷ], or [ɪ̞ʷ]. For the fully front variant of this vowel transcribed with ⟨ø⟩, see the close-mid front protruded vowel.

Acoustically, this sound is "between" the more typical compressed near-close front vowel [ʏ] and the unrounded near-close front vowel [ɪ].

=== Features ===
- Its vowel height is near-close, also known as near-high, which means the tongue is not quite so constricted as a close vowel (high vowel).
- Its vowel backness is front, which means the tongue is positioned forward in the mouth without creating a constriction that would be classified as a consonant. Rounded front vowels are often centralized, which means that often they are in fact near-front.
- Its roundedness is protruded, which means that the corners of the lips are drawn together, and the inner surfaces exposed. The prototypical [ʏ] has a weak rounding (though it is compressed, rather than protruded), more like [œ] than the neighboring cardinal vowels.

=== Occurrence ===
Language		Word	IPA	Meaning	Notes
Norwegian		nytt	[nʏ̫tː]	'new'	The example word is from Urban East Norwegian, in which the vowel varies between protruded [ʏ̫] and compressed [ʏ]. Its height has been variously described as near-close [ʏ] and close [y]. See Norwegian phonology.
Swedish	Central Standard	ylle	[²ʏ̫lːɛ̝]	'wool'	The height has been variously described as close-mid [ʏ̫˕], near-close [ʏ̫] and close [y̫]. See Swedish phonology

== Sources ==
- Altendorf, Ulrike; Watt, Dominik (2004), "The dialects in the South of England: phonology", in Schneider, Edgar W.; Burridge, Kate; Kortmann, Bernd; Mesthrie, Rajend; Upton, Clive (eds.), A handbook of varieties of English, vol. 1: Phonology, Mouton de Gruyter, pp. 181–196, ISBN 3-11-017532-0
- Árnason, Kristján (2011), The Phonology of Icelandic and Faroese, Oxford University Press, ISBN 978-0-19-922931-4
- Basbøll, Hans (2005), The Phonology of Danish, Taylor & Francis, ISBN 0-203-97876-5
- Basbøll, Hans; Wagner, Johannes (1985), Kontrastive Phonologie des Deutschen und Dänischen, Max Niemeyer Verlag, ISBN 978-3-484-30160-3
- Bauer, Laurie; Warren, Paul (2004), "New Zealand English: phonology", in Schneider, Edgar W.; Burridge, Kate; Kortmann, Bernd; Mesthrie, Rajend; Upton, Clive (eds.), A handbook of varieties of English, vol. 1: Phonology, Mouton de Gruyter, pp. 580–602, ISBN 3-11-017532-0
- Bauer, Laurie; Warren, Paul; Bardsley, Dianne; Kennedy, Marianna; Major, George (2007), "New Zealand English", Journal of the International Phonetic Association, 37 (1): 97–102, doi:10.1017/S0025100306002830
- Bolander, Maria (2001), Funktionell svensk grammatik (1st ed.), Liber AB, ISBN 9789147050543
- Chen, Yiya; Gussenhoven, Carlos (2015), "Shanghai Chinese", Journal of the International Phonetic Association, 45 (3): 321–327, doi:10.1017/S0025100315000043
- Collins, Beverley; Mees, Inger M. (2003) [First published 1981], The Phonetics of English and Dutch (5th ed.), Leiden: Brill Publishers, ISBN 9004103406
- Collins, Beverley; Mees, Inger M. (2013) [First published 2003], Practical Phonetics and Phonology: A Resource Book for Students (3rd ed.), Routledge, ISBN 978-0-415-50650-2
- Cruttenden, Alan (2014), Gimson's Pronunciation of English (8th ed.), Routledge, ISBN 9781444183092
- Dahlstedt, Karl-Hampus (1967), Svårigheter i svenskans uttal, Modersmålslärarnas förening
- Dudenredaktion; Kleiner, Stefan; Knöbl, Ralf (2015) [First published 1962], Das Aussprachewörterbuch (in German) (7th ed.), Berlin: Dudenverlag, ISBN 978-3-411-04067-4
- Einarsson, Stefán (1945), Icelandic. Grammar texts glossary., Baltimore: The Johns Hopkins Press, ISBN 978-0801863578
- Engstrand, Olle (1999), "Swedish", Handbook of the International Phonetic Association: A Guide to the usage of the International Phonetic Alphabet., Cambridge: Cambridge University Press, pp. 140–142, ISBN 0-521-63751-1
- Fougeron, Cecile; Smith, Caroline L. (1993), "French", Journal of the International Phonetic Association, 23 (2): 73–76, doi:10.1017/S0025100300004874, S2CID 249404451
- Göksel, Asli; Kerslake, Celia (2005), Turkish: a comprehensive grammar, Routledge, ISBN 978-0415114943
- Gussenhoven, Carlos (1992), "Dutch", Journal of the International Phonetic Association, 22 (2): 45–47, doi:10.1017/S002510030000459X, S2CID 243772965
- Gussenhoven, Carlos (2007), Wat is de beste transcriptie voor het Nederlands? (PDF) (in Dutch), Nijmegen: Radboud University, archived (PDF) from the original on 25 March 2017
- Gussmann, Edmund (2011), "Getting your head around: the vowel system of Modern Icelandic" (PDF), Folia Scandinavica Posnaniensia, 12: 71–90, ISBN 978-83-232-2296-5
- Hall, Christopher (2003) [First published 1992], Modern German pronunciation: An introduction for speakers of English (2nd ed.), Manchester: Manchester University Press, ISBN 0-7190-6689-1
- Hoey, Elliott (2013), Grammatical sketch of Turkmen, Santa Barbara: University of California
- International Phonetic Association (1999), Handbook of the International Phonetic Association: A guide to the use of the International Phonetic Alphabet, Cambridge: Cambridge University Press, ISBN 0-521-65236-7
- Kristoffersen, Gjert (2000), The Phonology of Norwegian, Oxford University Press, ISBN 978-0-19-823765-5
- Kvifte, Bjørn; Gude-Husken, Verena (2005) [First published 1997], Praktische Grammatik der norwegischen Sprache (3rd ed.), Gottfried Egert Verlag, ISBN 3-926972-54-8
- Ladefoged, Peter; Maddieson, Ian (1996). The Sounds of the World's Languages. Oxford: Blackwell. ISBN 0-631-19815-6.
- Lodge, Ken (2009), A Critical Introduction to Phonetics, Continuum International Publishing Group, ISBN 978-0-8264-8873-2
- Mannell, Robert; Cox, Felicity; Harrington, Jonathan (2009), An Introduction to Phonetics and Phonology, Macquarie University, archived from the original on 2009-09-22
- Peters, Jörg (2017), "Saterland Frisian", Journal of the International Phonetic Association, 49 (2): 223–230, doi:10.1017/S0025100317000226, S2CID 232348873
- Peterson, Hjalmar P. (2000), "Mátingar af sjálvljóðum í føruyskum", Málting, 28: 37–43
- Prehn, Maike (2012), Vowel quantity and the fortis-lenis distinction in North Low Saxon (PDF) (PhD), Amsterdam: LOT, ISBN 978-94-6093-077-5
- Przedlacka, Joanna (2001), "Estuary English and RP: Some Recent Findings" (PDF), Studia Anglica Posnaniensia, 36: 35–50
- Riad, Tomas (2014), The Phonology of Swedish, Oxford University Press, ISBN 978-0-19-954357-1
- Rietveld, Antonius C.M.; van Heuven, Vincent J. (2009) [First published 1997], Algemene Fonetiek (in Dutch) (3rd ed.), Bussum: Uitgeverij Coutinho, ISBN 978-90-469-0163-2
- Rowley, Anthony R. (1990), "14 North Bavarian", in Russ, Charles (ed.), The Dialects of Modern German: A Linguistic Survey, Abingdon: Routledge, pp. 417–437, ISBN 0-415-00308-3
- Scouller, Alastair (2017), The Gaelic Dialect of Colonsay (PhD thesis), Edinburgh: University of Edinburgh
- Stuart-Smith, Jane (2004), "Scottish English: phonology", in Schneider, Edgar W.; Burridge, Kate; Kortmann, Bernd; Mesthrie, Rajend; Upton, Clive (eds.), A handbook of varieties of English, vol. 1: Phonology, Mouton de Gruyter, pp. 47–67, ISBN 3-11-017532-0
- Szende, Tamás (1994), "Illustrations of the IPA: Hungarian", Journal of the International Phonetic Association, 24 (2): 91–94, doi:10.1017/S0025100300005090, S2CID 242632087
- Thomas, Erik R. (2004), "Rural Southern white accents", in Schneider, Edgar W.; Burridge, Kate; Kortmann, Bernd; Mesthrie, Rajend; Upton, Clive (eds.), A handbook of varieties of English, vol. 1: Phonology, Mouton de Gruyter, pp. 300–324, ISBN 3-11-017532-0
- Vanvik, Arne (1979), Norsk fonetikk, Oslo: Universitetet i Oslo, ISBN 82-990584-0-6
- Verhoeven, Jo (2005), "Belgian Standard Dutch", Journal of the International Phonetic Association, 35 (2): 243–247, doi:10.1017/S0025100305002173
- Viljoen, Melanie Helen (2013), A grammatical description of the Buwal language, Melbourne: La Trobe University
- Walker, Douglas (1984), The Pronunciation of Canadian French (PDF), Ottawa: University of Ottawa Press, ISBN 0-7766-4500-5
- Zimmer, Karl; Orgun, Orhan (1999), "Turkish" ( (PDF)), Handbook of the International Phonetic Association: A guide to the use of the International Phonetic Alphabet, Cambridge: Cambridge University Press, pp. 154–158, ISBN 0-521-65236-7, archived from the original on 2018-07-25

Place →	Labial					Coronal										Dorsal					Laryngeal			
Manner ↓	Bilabial		Labiodental		Linguolabial		Dental		Alveolar		Postalveolar		Retroflex		(Alveolo-)palatal		Velar		Uvular		Pharyngeal/epiglottal		Glottal	
Nasal	m̥	m	ɱ̊	ɱ		n̼	n̪̊	n̪	n̥	n	n̠̊	n̠	ɳ̊	ɳ	ɲ̊	ɲ	ŋ̊	ŋ	ɴ̥	ɴ				
Plosive	p	b	p̪	b̪	t̼	d̼	t̪	d̪	t	d			ʈ	ɖ	c	ɟ	k	ɡ	q	ɢ	ʡ		ʔ	
Sibilant affricate							t̪s̪	d̪z̪	ts	dz	t̠ʃ	d̠ʒ	tʂ	dʐ	tɕ	dʑ								
Non-sibilant affricate	pɸ	bβ	p̪f	b̪v			t̪θ	d̪ð	tɹ̝̊	dɹ̝	t̠ɹ̠̊˔	d̠ɹ̠˔			cç	ɟʝ	kx	ɡɣ	qχ	ɢʁ	ʡʜ	ʡʢ	ʔh	
Sibilant fricative							s̪	z̪	s	z	ʃ	ʒ	ʂ	ʐ	ɕ	ʑ								
Non-sibilant fricative	ɸ	β	f	v	θ̼	ð̼	θ	ð	θ̠	ð̠	ɹ̠̊˔	ɹ̠˔	ɻ̊˔	ɻ˔	ç	ʝ	x	ɣ	χ	ʁ	ħ	ʕ	h	ɦ
Approximant		β̞		ʋ				ð̞		ɹ		ɹ̠		ɻ		j		ɰ						˷
Tap/flap		ⱱ̟		ⱱ					ɾ̥	ɾ			ɽ̊	ɽ						ɢ̆		ʡ̆		
Trill	ʙ̥	ʙ							r̥	r		r̠	ɽ̊r̥	ɽr					ʀ̥	ʀ	ʜ	ʢ		
Lateral affricate									tɬ	dɮ			tꞎ	d𝼅	c𝼆	ɟʎ̝	k𝼄	ɡʟ̝						
Lateral fricative							ɬ̪		ɬ	ɮ			ꞎ	𝼅	𝼆	ʎ̝	𝼄	ʟ̝						
Lateral approximant								l̪	l̥	l		l̠	ɭ̊	ɭ	ʎ̥	ʎ	ʟ̥	ʟ		ʟ̠				
Lateral tap/flap									ɺ̥	ɺ			𝼈̊	𝼈		ʎ̆		ʟ̆						

		BL	LD	D	A	PA	RF	P	V	U
Implosive	Voiced	ɓ			ɗ		ᶑ	ʄ	ɠ	ʛ
Implosive	Voiceless	ɓ̥			ɗ̥		ᶑ̊	ʄ̊	ɠ̊	ʛ̥
Ejective	Stop	pʼ			tʼ		ʈʼ	cʼ	kʼ	qʼ
Ejective	Affricate		p̪fʼ	tθʼ	tsʼ	tʃʼ	tʂʼ	tɕʼ	kxʼ	qχʼ
Ejective	Fricative	ɸʼ	fʼ	θʼ	sʼ	ʃʼ	ʂʼ	ɕʼ	xʼ	χʼ
Ejective	Lateral affricate				tɬʼ			c𝼆ʼ	k𝼄ʼ	q𝼄ʼ
Ejective	Lateral fricative				ɬʼ					
Click (top: velar; bottom: uvular)	Tenuis	kʘ qʘ		kǀ qǀ	kǃ qǃ		k𝼊 q𝼊	kǂ qǂ		
Click (top: velar; bottom: uvular)	Voiced	ɡʘ ɢʘ		ɡǀ ɢǀ	ɡǃ ɢǃ		ɡ𝼊 ɢ𝼊	ɡǂ ɢǂ		
Click (top: velar; bottom: uvular)	Nasal	ŋʘ ɴʘ		ŋǀ ɴǀ	ŋǃ ɴǃ		ŋ𝼊 ɴ𝼊	ŋǂ ɴǂ	ʞ	
Click (top: velar; bottom: uvular)	Tenuis lateral				kǁ qǁ					
Click (top: velar; bottom: uvular)	Voiced lateral				ɡǁ ɢǁ					
Click (top: velar; bottom: uvular)	Nasal lateral				ŋǁ ɴǁ					
