= Near-close vowel =

Type of vowel sound

IPA: Vowels

	Front	Central	Back
Close	i y	ɨ ʉ	ɯ u
Near-close	ɪ ʏ		ʊ
Close-mid	e ø	ɘ ɵ	ɤ o
Mid	e̞ ø̞	ə	ɤ̞ o̞
Open-mid	ɛ œ	ɜ ɞ	ʌ ɔ
Near-open	æ	ɐ
Open	a ɶ	ä	ɑ ɒ

- IPA help
- audio
- full chart
- template

Legend: unrounded • rounded

Vowel diagram illustrating the /i–ɪ̟–e/ and /u–ʊ̠–o/ contrasts in Sotho, from Doke & Mofokeng (1974:?). The near-close vowels are normally transcribed without diacritics (i.e. as ⟨ɪ⟩ and ⟨ʊ⟩, respectively), or even with the symbols for close central vowels (⟨ɨ⟩ and ⟨ʉ⟩, respectively), though the latter set is not phonetically correct.

A near-close vowel or a near-high vowel is any in a class of vowel sound used in some spoken languages. The defining characteristic of a near-close vowel is that the tongue is positioned similarly to a close vowel, but slightly less constricted.

Other names for a near-close vowel are lowered close vowel and raised close-mid vowel, though the former phrase may also be used to describe a vowel that is as low as close-mid (sometimes even lower); likewise, the latter phrase may also be used to describe a vowel that is as high as close.

Near-close vowels are also sometimes described as lax variants of the fully close vowels, though, depending on the language, they may not necessarily be variants of close vowels at all.

It is rare for languages to contrast a near-close vowel with a close vowel and a close-mid vowel based on height alone. An example of such language is Danish, which contrasts short and long versions of the close front unrounded /i/, near-close front unrounded /e̝/ and close-mid front unrounded /e/ vowels, though in order to avoid using any relative articulation diacritics, Danish /e̝/ and /e/ are typically transcribed with phonetically inaccurate symbols /e/ and /ɛ/, respectively. This contrast is not present in Conservative Danish, which realizes the latter two vowels as, respectively, close-mid [e] and mid [e̞].

It is even rarer for languages to contrast more than one close/near-close/close-mid triplet. For instance, Sotho has two such triplets: fully front /i–ɪ–e/ and fully back /u–ʊ–o/. In the case of this language, the near-close vowels /ɪ, ʊ/ tend to be transcribed with the phonetically inaccurate symbols /ɨ, ʉ/, i.e. as if they were close central.

It may be somewhat more common for languages to contain allophonic vowel triplets that are not contrastive; for instance, Russian has one such triplet:

- close central rounded [ʉ], an allophone of /u/ between soft consonants in stressed syllables;
- near-close central rounded [ʉ̞], an allophone of /u/ between soft consonants in unstressed syllables;
- close-mid central rounded [ɵ], an allophone of /o/ after soft consonants.

== Partial list ==
The near-close vowels that have dedicated symbols in the International Phonetic Alphabet are:

- near-close near-front unrounded vowel [ɪ]
- near-close near-front compressed vowel [ʏ]
- near-close near-back rounded vowel [ʊ]

The Handbook of the International Phonetic Association defines these vowels as mid-centralized (lowered and centralized) equivalents of, respectively, [i], [y] and [u], therefore, an alternative transcription of these vowels is [i̽, y̽, u̽] or the more complex [ï̞, ÿ˕, ü̞]; however, they are not centralized in all languages - some languages have a fully front variant of [ɪ] and/or a fully back variant of [ʊ]; the exact backness of these variants can be transcribed in the IPA with [ɪ̟, ʊ̠], [i̞, u̞] or [e̝, o̝].

There also are near-close vowels that don't have dedicated symbols in the IPA:

- near-close near-front protruded vowel [ʏʷ]
- near-close central unrounded vowel [ɨ̞] (ᵻ)
- near-close central compressed vowel [ʏ̈]
- near-close central protruded vowel [ʉ̞] (ᵿ)
- near-close near-back unrounded vowel [ɯ̽] or [ɯ̞̈]
- near-close near-back compressed vowel [ʊᵝ]

(IPA letters for rounded vowels are ambiguous as to whether the rounding is protrusion or compression. However, transcription of the world's languages tend to pattern as above.)

Other near-close vowels can be indicated with diacritics of relative articulation applied to letters for neighboring vowels, such as ⟨ɪ̟⟩, ⟨i̞⟩ or ⟨e̝⟩ for a near-close front unrounded vowel, or ⟨ʊ̠⟩, ⟨u̞⟩ or ⟨o̝⟩ for a near-close back rounded vowel.

== Bibliography ==
- Basbøll, Hans (2005), The Phonology of Danish, ISBN 0-203-97876-5
- Doke, Clement Martyn; Mofokeng, S. Machabe (1974), Textbook of Southern Sotho Grammar (3rd ed.), Cape Town: Longman Southern Africa, ISBN 0-582-61700-6
- International Phonetic Association (1999), Handbook of the International Phonetic Association: A guide to the use of the International Phonetic Alphabet, Cambridge: Cambridge University Press, ISBN 0-521-65236-7
- Jones, Daniel; Ward, Dennis (1969), The Phonetics of Russian, Cambridge University Press, ISBN 0-521-06736-7
- Ladefoged, Peter; Johnson, Keith (2010), A Course in Phonetics (6th ed.), Boston, Massachusetts: Wadsworth Publishing, ISBN 978-1-4282-3126-9
- Lee, Hyun Bok (1999), "Korean", Handbook of the International Phonetic Association, Cambridge University Press, pp. 120–122, ISBN 0-521-63751-1

Place →	Labial					Coronal										Dorsal					Laryngeal			
Manner ↓	Bilabial		Labiodental		Linguolabial		Dental		Alveolar		Postalveolar		Retroflex		(Alveolo-)palatal		Velar		Uvular		Pharyngeal/epiglottal		Glottal	
Nasal	m̥	m	ɱ̊	ɱ		n̼	n̪̊	n̪	n̥	n	n̠̊	n̠	ɳ̊	ɳ	ɲ̊	ɲ	ŋ̊	ŋ	ɴ̥	ɴ				
Plosive	p	b	p̪	b̪	t̼	d̼	t̪	d̪	t	d			ʈ	ɖ	c	ɟ	k	ɡ	q	ɢ	ʡ		ʔ	
Sibilant affricate							t̪s̪	d̪z̪	ts	dz	t̠ʃ	d̠ʒ	tʂ	dʐ	tɕ	dʑ								
Non-sibilant affricate	pɸ	bβ	p̪f	b̪v			t̪θ	d̪ð	tɹ̝̊	dɹ̝	t̠ɹ̠̊˔	d̠ɹ̠˔			cç	ɟʝ	kx	ɡɣ	qχ	ɢʁ	ʡʜ	ʡʢ	ʔh	
Sibilant fricative							s̪	z̪	s	z	ʃ	ʒ	ʂ	ʐ	ɕ	ʑ								
Non-sibilant fricative	ɸ	β	f	v	θ̼	ð̼	θ	ð	θ̠	ð̠	ɹ̠̊˔	ɹ̠˔	ɻ̊˔	ɻ˔	ç	ʝ	x	ɣ	χ	ʁ	ħ	ʕ	h	ɦ
Approximant		β̞		ʋ				ð̞		ɹ		ɹ̠		ɻ		j		ɰ						˷
Tap/flap		ⱱ̟		ⱱ					ɾ̥	ɾ			ɽ̊	ɽ						ɢ̆		ʡ̮		
Trill	ʙ̥	ʙ							r̥	r		r̠	ɽ̊r̥	ɽr					ʀ̥	ʀ	ʜ	ʢ		
Lateral affricate									tɬ	dɮ			tꞎ	d𝼅	c𝼆	ɟʎ̝	k𝼄	ɡʟ̝						
Lateral fricative							ɬ̪		ɬ	ɮ			ꞎ	𝼅	𝼆	ʎ̝	𝼄	ʟ̝						
Lateral approximant								l̪	l̥	l		l̠	ɭ̊	ɭ	ʎ̥	ʎ	ʟ̥	ʟ		ʟ̠				
Lateral tap/flap									ɺ̥	ɺ			𝼈̊	𝼈		ʎ̮		ʟ̆						

		BL	LD	D	A	PA	RF	P	V	U
Implosive	Voiced	ɓ			ɗ		ᶑ	ʄ	ɠ	ʛ
Implosive	Voiceless	ɓ̥			ɗ̥		ᶑ̊	ʄ̊	ɠ̊	ʛ̥
Ejective	Stop	pʼ			tʼ		ʈʼ	cʼ	kʼ	qʼ
Ejective	Affricate		p̪fʼ	t̪θʼ	tsʼ	t̠ʃʼ	tʂʼ	tɕʼ	kxʼ	qχʼ
Ejective	Fricative	ɸʼ	fʼ	θʼ	sʼ	ʃʼ	ʂʼ	ɕʼ	xʼ	χʼ
Ejective	Lateral affricate				tɬʼ			c𝼆ʼ	k𝼄ʼ	q𝼄ʼ
Ejective	Lateral fricative				ɬʼ					
Click (top: velar; bottom: uvular)	Tenuis	kʘ qʘ		kǀ qǀ	kǃ qǃ		k𝼊 q𝼊	kǂ qǂ		
Click (top: velar; bottom: uvular)	Voiced	ɡʘ ɢʘ		ɡǀ ɢǀ	ɡǃ ɢǃ		ɡ𝼊 ɢ𝼊	ɡǂ ɢǂ		
Click (top: velar; bottom: uvular)	Nasal	ŋʘ ɴʘ		ŋǀ ɴǀ	ŋǃ ɴǃ		ŋ𝼊 ɴ𝼊	ŋǂ ɴǂ	ʞ	
Click (top: velar; bottom: uvular)	Tenuis lateral				kǁ qǁ					
Click (top: velar; bottom: uvular)	Voiced lateral				ɡǁ ɢǁ					
Click (top: velar; bottom: uvular)	Nasal lateral				ŋǁ ɴǁ					
