= Close vowel =

Class of vowel sounds

IPA: Vowels

	Front	Central	Back
Close	i y	ɨ ʉ	ɯ u
Near-close	ɪ ʏ		ʊ
Close-mid	e ø	ɘ ɵ	ɤ o
Mid	e̞ ø̞	ə	ɤ̞ o̞
Open-mid	ɛ œ	ɜ ɞ	ʌ ɔ
Near-open	æ	ɐ
Open	a ɶ	ä	ɑ ɒ

- IPA help
- audio
- full chart
- template

Legend: unrounded • rounded

A close vowel, also known as a high vowel (in U.S. terminology), is any in a class of vowel sounds used in many spoken languages. The defining characteristic of a close vowel is that the tongue is positioned approximately as close as possible to the roof of the mouth as it can be without creating a constriction. A constriction would produce a sound that would be classified as a consonant.

The term "close" /ˈkloʊs/ is recommended by the International Phonetic Association. Close vowels are often referred to as "high" vowels, as in the Americanist phonetic tradition, because the tongue is positioned high in the mouth during articulation.

In the context of the phonology of any particular language, a high vowel can be any vowel that is more close than a mid vowel. That is, close-mid vowels, near-close vowels, and close vowels can all be considered high vowels.

== Partial list ==
The six close vowels that have dedicated symbols in the International Phonetic Alphabet are:

- close front unrounded vowel [i]
- close front compressed vowel [y]
- close central unrounded vowel [ɨ]
- close central protruded vowel [ʉ]
- close back unrounded vowel [ɯ]
- close back protruded vowel [u]

(IPA letters for rounded vowels are ambiguous as to whether the rounding is protrusion or compression. However, transcription of the world's languages tends to pattern as above.)

There also are close vowels that do not have dedicated symbols in the IPA:

- close front protruded vowel [ʉ̟] (yʷ)
- close central compressed vowel [ÿ] (ɏ)
- close back compressed vowel [ɯᵝ] (u͍)

Other close vowels can be indicated with diacritics of relative articulation applied to letters for neighboring vowels, such as ⟨i̠⟩ or ⟨ɪ̝⟩ for a close near-front unrounded vowel.

== See also ==
- Open vowel

Place →	Labial					Coronal										Dorsal					Laryngeal			
Manner ↓	Bilabial		Labiodental		Linguolabial		Dental		Alveolar		Postalveolar		Retroflex		Palatal		Velar		Uvular		Pharyngeal/epiglottal		Glottal	
Nasal	m̥	m	ɱ̊	ɱ		n̼			n̥	n			ɳ̊	ɳ	ɲ̊	ɲ	ŋ̊	ŋ	ɴ̥	ɴ				
Plosive	p	b	p̪	b̪	t̼	d̼			t	d			ʈ	ɖ	c	ɟ	k	ɡ	q	ɢ	ʡ		ʔ	
Sibilant affricate									ts	dz	t̠ʃ	d̠ʒ	tʂ	dʐ	tɕ	dʑ								
Non-sibilant affricate	pɸ	bβ	p̪f	b̪v			t̪θ	d̪ð	tɹ̝̊	dɹ̝	t̠ɹ̠̊˔	d̠ɹ̠˔			cç	ɟʝ	kx	ɡɣ	qχ	ɢʁ	ʡʜ	ʡʢ	ʔh	
Sibilant fricative									s	z	ʃ	ʒ	ʂ	ʐ	ɕ	ʑ								
Non-sibilant fricative	ɸ	β	f	v	θ̼	ð̼	θ	ð	θ̠	ð̠	ɹ̠̊˔	ɹ̠˔	ɻ̊˔	ɻ˔	ç	ʝ	x	ɣ	χ	ʁ	ħ	ʕ	h	ɦ
Approximant				ʋ						ɹ				ɻ		j		ɰ						ʔ̞
Tap/flap		ⱱ̟		ⱱ		ɾ̼			ɾ̥	ɾ			ɽ̊	ɽ						ɢ̆		ʡ̆		
Trill	ʙ̥	ʙ							r̥	r			ɽ̊r̥	ɽr					ʀ̥	ʀ	ʜ	ʢ		
Lateral affricate									tɬ	dɮ			tꞎ	d𝼅	c𝼆	ɟʎ̝	k𝼄	ɡʟ̝						
Lateral fricative									ɬ	ɮ			ꞎ	𝼅	𝼆	ʎ̝	𝼄	ʟ̝						
Lateral approximant										l				ɭ		ʎ		ʟ		ʟ̠				
Lateral tap/flap									ɺ̥	ɺ			𝼈̥	𝼈		ʎ̆		ʟ̆						

		BL	LD	D	A	PA	RF	P	V	U	EG
Ejective	Stop	pʼ			tʼ		ʈʼ	cʼ	kʼ	qʼ	ʡʼ
Ejective	Affricate		p̪fʼ	t̪θʼ	tsʼ	t̠ʃʼ	tʂʼ	tɕʼ	kxʼ	qχʼ	
Ejective	Fricative	ɸʼ	fʼ	θʼ	sʼ	ʃʼ	ʂʼ	ɕʼ	xʼ	χʼ	
Ejective	Lateral affricate				tɬʼ			c𝼆ʼ	k𝼄ʼ	q𝼄ʼ	
Ejective	Lateral fricative				ɬʼ						
Click (top: velar; bottom: uvular)	Tenuis	kʘ qʘ		kǀ qǀ	kǃ qǃ		k𝼊 q𝼊	kǂ qǂ			
Click (top: velar; bottom: uvular)	Voiced	ɡʘ ɢʘ		ɡǀ ɢǀ	ɡǃ ɢǃ		ɡ𝼊 ɢ𝼊	ɡǂ ɢǂ			
Click (top: velar; bottom: uvular)	Nasal	ŋʘ ɴʘ		ŋǀ ɴǀ	ŋǃ ɴǃ		ŋ𝼊 ɴ𝼊	ŋǂ ɴǂ	ʞ		
Click (top: velar; bottom: uvular)	Tenuis lateral				kǁ qǁ						
Click (top: velar; bottom: uvular)	Voiced lateral				ɡǁ ɢǁ						
Click (top: velar; bottom: uvular)	Nasal lateral				ŋǁ ɴǁ						
Implosive	Voiced	ɓ			ɗ		ᶑ	ʄ	ɠ	ʛ	
Implosive	Voiceless	ɓ̥			ɗ̥		ᶑ̊	ʄ̊	ɠ̊	ʛ̥	
