= Obsolete and nonstandard IPA symbols =

There are a variety of obsolete and nonstandard symbols (letters and diacritics) that have been used in and alongside the International Phonetic Alphabet (IPA). These fall into a few basic categories, including:

- Those used historically in the IPA
  - Some represent standard phonetic values and have been modified or replaced completely, such as ⟨ɩ ɷ⟩ for modern [ɪ ʊ]
  - Others represent varied manners and places of articulation, phonation states, or sounds paired with secondary articulation, and have been dropped altogether with the idea that they should instead be indicated with diacritics, such as ⟨ƥ ƭ ƙ⟩ for modern [ɓ̥ ɗ̥ ɠ̊]
- Those specific to local linguistic traditions that otherwise use standard IPA
  - Some represent sounds in a more simplified form, such as the Americanist ⟨ƛ λ⟩ for standard [t͡ɬ d͡ɮ]
  - Others represent phonemes and phones that may be generally difficult to describe with the usage of standard letters and diacritics, such as the Sinological ⟨ɿ ʮ⟩ for so-called "apical vowels"
- Those which fill in "gaps" of the IPA chart
  - Some are "implicit" or "expected" symbols created or used by iconic analogy to symbols for related sounds, such as ⟨ᴘ 𝼈 ⟩ for [ʙ̥ ɭ̆ ]
  - Others are simply created or used for common sounds that lack independent symbols, such as ⟨ᴀ ᴇ ꭥ⟩ for [ä e̞ o̞]
- Those applying to any of the above categories that have been proposed for usage in or adjacent to the IPA
  - Some have been formally proposed to and rejected by the International Phonetic Association, many of which have been largely or entirely unused outside of their respective proposals
  - Others have been informally proposed and occasionally used but have lacked widespread consensus in their usage, often being idiosyncratic or seeing a number of competing proposals to represent a sound

These may all be referred to as para-IPA, a term describing "symbols that are commonly used within IPA notation but that are not themselves part of the IPA alphabet."

== About and related ==
While the IPA does not itself have a set of capital letters (the ones that look like capitals are actually small capitals), many languages have adopted symbols from the IPA as part of their orthographies, and in such cases they have invented capital variants of these. This is especially common in Africa. An example is Kabiyé of northern Togo, which has ⟨Ɔ Ɛ Ŋ Ɣ⟩. Other pseudo-IPA capitals supported by Unicode are ⟨Ɓ/Ƃ Ƈ Ɗ/Ƌ Ə/Ǝ Ɠ Ħ Ɯ Ɲ Ɵ Ʃ (capital ʃ) Ʈ Ʊ Ʋ Ʒ⟩ (see case variants of IPA letters).

Capital letters are also used as cover symbols in phonotactic descriptions: ⟨C⟩ = consonant, ⟨V⟩ = vowel, ⟨N⟩ = nasal, ⟨S⟩ = sonorant or sibilant, etc. When these symbols are used for indeterminate sounds, extIPA recommends the use of a surrounding circle ⟨◯⟩. The asterisk ⟨*⟩ is the convention the IPA uses when it has no symbol for a phone or feature, but which is typically determinate (for example the creaky-voiced glottal approximant reported by Ladefoged & Maddieson); extIPA explicitly defines the symbol for this purpose. Symbols used in either case (indeterminate sounds and determinate but lacking a formal symbol) may be referred to as wildcard symbols. The table below includes a handful of other nonstandard wildcards.

In addition to the categories mentioned above, this table also contains symbols that are sometimes seen as typographical substitutes or are otherwise mistaken for proper IPA symbols due to similarity of shape. Typographical substitutions were commonly seen in the typewriter era, prior to the computer encoding of characters and introduction of Unicode. There are also some symbols from local linguistic traditions which are used as equivalents rather than simplifications (as are commonly seen for affricates).

The table does not include commonplace extensions or conventions of the IPA, such as doubling a symbol for a greater degree of a feature ([aːː] extra-long [a], [ˈˈa] extra stress, [kʰʰ] strongly aspirated [k], and [a˞˞] extra-rhotic [a]), nor superscripting for a lesser degree of a feature ([ᵑɡ] slightly prenasalized [ɡ], [ᵗs] slightly affricated [s], and [ᵊ] epenthetic schwa).

== Table ==
Obsolete and/or nonstandard International Phonetic Alphabet symbols
Symbol or exemplar	Description	Meaning in IPA	Standard IPA equivalent	Notes
,	comma	secondary stress	ˌ	typewriter substitution
'	apostrophe	primary stress	ˈ	typewriter substitution
'	apostrophe	glottal stop	ʔ	typewriter substitution
7	digit seven	glottal stop	ʔ	typewriter substitution
?	question mark	glottal stop	ʔ	typewriter substitution
ɋ	turned b with tail	bilabial click	ʘ	used by Mattes & Omark (1984); see click letter
Ꙩ, 𐍈, 𐓃 etc.	circled dot	bilabial click	ʘ	a mistake, similarity of shape
ꜰ	small capital f	voiceless bilabial fricative	ɸ	replaced in 1928
φ	Greek phi	voiceless bilabial fricative	ɸ	a mistake, typewriter substitution or similarity of shape
‼︎	double exclamation mark	retroflex click	𝼊	typewriter substitution
⦀ or ⫻	triple bar or slash	retroflex click	𝼊	Used by Cole (1966); recalls the dental and lateral click letters ⟨ǀ, ǁ⟩ as well as Doke's historical retroflex click letters ⟨ψ, ψ⟩
ψ	Greek psi	retroflex click	𝼊	used by Doke (1925); see click letter
ψ	Greek psi	bunched-r	ɹ̈	proposed by Laver (1994)
ψ	Greek psi	voiced bilabial fricative trill	ʙ̝	used by Sinologists
ψ	Greek psi	voiceless bilabial trill	ʙ̥	used by Sinologists; likely a reanalysis of the earlier described fricative trill
ψ	Greek psi	voiceless labial–alveolar sibilant affricate	p͡s	used by Blench (2008)
ψ	Greek psi	voiced bilabial trill	ʙ	used by Uralicists
ᴪ	small capital Greek psi	voiceless bilabial trill	ʙ̥	used by Uralicists
ᴘ	small capital p	voiceless bilabial trill	ʙ̥	para-IPA, by analogy of ⟨ʙ⟩ for the voiced equivalent
ᴘ	small capital p	voiceless linguolabial plosive	t̼ or p᫥	Used by PRDS Group (1983), suggested by Ball (1987)
ᴘ	small capital p	voiceless labiodental plosive	p̪	Proposed in 1911, rejected
π	Greek pi	voiceless labiodental plosive	p̪	Proposed in 1911, 1949, and 1989, rejected
ȹ	qp ligature	voiceless labiodental plosive	p̪	Used by Bantuists; also used by Ball for AddPhon in 2025
ᴍ	small capital m	voiced linguolabial nasal	n̼ or m̼	Used by PRDS Group (1983), suggested by Ball (1987)
ᴍ	small capital m	voiced labiodental nasal	ɱ	Proposed in 1911, rejected
μ	Greek mu	voiced labiodental nasal	ɱ	Proposed in 1911, rejected
(m͏̡)	m with middle hook	voiced labiodental nasal	ɱ	Proposed in 1911, rejected
ʙ	small capital b	voiced linguolabial plosive	d̼ or b̼	Used by PRDS Group (1983), suggested by Ball (1987); ⟨ʙ⟩ was approved for its current placement in 1989
ʙ	small capital b	voiced labiodental plosive	b̪	Proposed in 1911, rejected
β	Greek beta	voiced labiodental plosive	b̪	Proposed in 1911, rejected
(℔)	lb ligature	voiced labiodental plosive	b̪	Proposed in 1989, rejected
б	Cyrillic be	voiced labiodental plosive	b̪	Proposed in 1989, rejected
ȸ	db ligature	voiced labiodental plosive	b̪	Used by Bantuists; also used by Ball for AddPhon in 2025
ȸ	db ligature	voiced linguolabial plosive	d̼ or b̼	Proposed in 1989, rejected
(ꝥ)	thorn with stroke or t–p ligature	voiceless linguolabial plosive	t̼ or p᫥	Proposed in 1989, rejected
nm	m–n or n–m ligature	fricated bilabial nasal	m̾	Proposed in 1989, rejected
nɱ	m–ŋ or n–ɱ ligature	voiced labial–velar nasal	ŋ͡m	Proposed in 1989, rejected
kp	k–p ligature	voiceless labial–velar plosive	k͡p	Proposed in 1989, rejected
Ƿ	small capital wynn	voiceless linguolabial fricative	θ̼ or f̼	Used by PRDS Group (1983), suggested by Ball (1987)
θf	theta–f ligature	voiceless linguolabial fricative	θ̼ or f̼	Proposed in 1989, rejected
8	small digit eight	voiced linguolabial fricative	ð̼ or v̼	Used by PRDS Group (1983), suggested by Ball (1987)
or	beta–eth ligature	voiced linguolabial fricative	ð̼ or v̼	Proposed in 1989, rejected
ƀ	b with stroke	voiced bilabial fricative	β	used in the RFE Phonetic Alphabet
ß	sharp s	voiced bilabial fricative	β	a mistake, typewriter substitution or similarity of shape
∫ or $\int$	integral symbol	voiceless postalveolar fricative	ʃ	a mistake, typewriter substitution or similarity of shape
3, з, or ȝ	digit three, Cyrillic ze, or yogh	open-mid central unrounded vowel	ɜ	a mistake, typewriter substitution or similarity of shape
3, з, or ȝ	digit three, Cyrillic ze, or yogh	voiced postalveolar fricative	ʒ	a mistake, typewriter substitution or similarity of shape
∂ or ꝺ	partial differential or insular d	voiced dental fricative	ð	a mistake, typewriter substitution or similarity of shape
đ	d with stroke	voiced dental fricative	ð	a mistake, typewriter substitution or similarity of shape
đ	d with stroke	voiced dental fricative	ð	used in the RFE Phonetic Alphabet
δ or ẟ	Greek or Latin delta	voiced dental fricative	ð	used by Uralicists
ϑ	cursive Greek theta	voiceless dental fricative	θ	used by Uralicists
þ	thorn	voiceless dental fricative	θ	Proposed by early 20th century American phoneticians for English dictionaries; (Note: Weeks (1906), p. 32 in reference to Joint Committee (1904), pp. 17, 36–37) also proposed in 1989, rejected
ŧ	t with stroke	voiceless dental fricative	θ	Used by Meillet & Cohen (1952)
ƃ	b with top bar	voiced bilabial trill	ʙ	Proposed in 1989, rejected
(ɋ)	b with left hook	voiced bilabial trill	ʙ	formerly used in the General Alphabet of Cameroon Languages and its phonetic description, now represented with ⟨br⟩
b̃	b with tilde	voiced bilabial trill	ʙ	Common Americanist convention, analogous to ⟨r̃, ṛ̃⟩ used for [r, ɽ͡r]
	b with curl	voiced bilabial trill	ʙ	proposed in 1931 (before ⟨ʙ⟩ was officially adopted), rejected
𝼥	b with right mid hook	voiced bilabial trill	ʙ	proposed in 1931 (before ⟨ʙ⟩ was officially adopted), rejected
ᵬ	b with top combining tilde	voiced bilabial trill	ʙ	proposed in 1931 (before ⟨ʙ⟩ was officially adopted), rejected
ƍ	turned delta	voiced bilabial trill	ʙ	proposed in 1931 (before ⟨ʙ⟩ was officially adopted), rejected
ƍ	turned delta	labialized voiced alveolar or dental fricative	zʷ, zᵝ, z̫, z͎, ðʷ	intended for the voiced whistled sibilant of Bantu languages, withdrawn 1976
ɀ	z with swash tail	labialized voiced alveolar or dental fricative	zʷ, zᵝ, z̫, z͎, ðʷ	used by Doke for Shona; proposed to replace ⟨ƍ⟩ in 1931, rejected
ɋ	p with tail	labialized voiced alveolar or dental fricative	zʷ, zᵝ, z̫, z͎, ðʷ	Allographs of Doke's ⟨ƍ⟩
ǫ	reversed o with ogonek	labialized voiced alveolar or dental fricative	zʷ, zᵝ, z̫, z͎, ðʷ	Allographs of Doke's ⟨ƍ⟩
σ	sigma	labialized voiceless alveolar or dental fricative	sʷ, sᶲ, s̫, s͎, θʷ	intended for the voiceless whistled sibilant of Bantu languages, withdrawn 1976
ȿ	s with swash tail	labialized voiceless alveolar or dental fricative	sʷ, sᶲ, s̫, s͎, θʷ	used by Doke for Shona; proposed to replace ⟨σ⟩ in 1931, rejected
ƺ	ezh with tail	labialized voiced palatal or palato-alveolar fricative	ʝʷ, ʝᵓ, ʒᶣ, ʒꟹ	intended for w before front vowels in Twi; may also be used for the lightly rounded English /ʒ/, withdrawn 1976
ƪ	reversed esh with top loop	labialized voiceless palatal or palato-alveolar fricative	çʷ, çᵓ, ʃᶣ, ʃꟹ	intended for ⟨hw⟩ before front vowels in Twi; may also be used for the lightly rounded English /ʃ/, withdrawn 1976
ƻ	barred digit two	voiced alveolar affricate	d͡z	introduced in 1947, withdrawn 1976
ƾ	t–s ligature (inverted glottal stop with stroke)	voiceless alveolar affricate	t͡s	introduced in 1947, withdrawn 1976
ȼ	c with stroke	voiceless alveolar affricate	t͡s	Used by Americanists
(ɰ)	h–m ligature	voiceless bilabial nasal	m̥	proposed in 1949, rejected
(ꭋ)	script r	voiceless alveolar trill	r̥	proposed in 1949, rejected
↊ (2)	turned digit two	voiceless pharyngeal fricative	ħ	proposed in 1949, rejected
↋ (3)	turned digit three	voiced pharyngeal fricative	ʕ	proposed in 1949, rejected
ꜫ	tresillo	uvular ejective	qʼ	used by Mayanists
ꜭ	cuatrillo	alveolar ejective affricate or postalveolar ejective affricate or velar ejective	tsʼ, tʃʼ, or kʼ	used by Mayanists
nʋ	nv ligature (nwair)	voiced labiodental nasal	ɱ	used in the Swedish Dialect Alphabet
nʋ	nv ligature (nwair)	close front rounded vowel	y	proposed in 1989, rejected
ᵿ˞	barred horseshoe u with hook	back sulcal vowel		proposed in 1989, rejected
	w with left hook	voiced labial–velar fricative (labialized voiced velar fricative)	w̝ or ʍ̬ or ɣʷ	proposed in 1989, rejected
	long-leg g	voiced velar lateral approximant	ʟ	proposed in 1989, rejected
ʕr	reversed glottal stop–r ligature	voiced epiglottal trill	ʢ	proposed in 1989, rejected
ʕʀ	reversed glottal stop–small capital r ligature	voiced epiglottal trill	ʢ	proposed in 1989, rejected
	letters with left-swinging top hook	dental consonants	t̪ d̪ n̪ l̪ r̪	proposed in 1989, rejected
т д н л р	Cyrillic letters	dental consonants	t̪ d̪ n̪ l̪ r̪	proposed in 1989, rejected
𝼪 𝼥 𝼧 𝼦 𝼨 𝼩	letters with left-swinging mid hook	retroflex consonants	ʈ ɖ ɳ ɭ ɻ ʂ ʐ	Malayalam transcriptions; briefly used in the 1921 chart, with ⟨r⟩ for [ɻ] instead of ⟨𝼨⟩
	n with left arm	voiced dental nasal	n̪	Proposed by Trager (1964)
ƕ	hv ligature (hwair)	voiceless labial–velar approximant	ʍ̞ or w̥	appears only in the 1921 chart
ƕ	hv ligature (hwair)	voiceless alveolar lateral fricative	ɬ	proposed in 1989, rejected
hɥ	h–turned h ligature	voiceless labial–palatal approximant	ɥ̊	appears only in the 1921 chart
	back esh	sj-sound	ɧ	historical appearance of ⟨ɧ⟩ from its introduction in 1947 until 1979, when its gained its full left leg
ƃ or б	small capital b with top bar or Cyrillic be	voiced bilabial frictionless continuant	β̞	proposed in 2011
ъ	small capital Cyrillic hard sign	voiced bilabial frictionless continuant	β̞	proposed in 2011
β	reversed Greek beta	voiced bilabial frictionless continuant	β̞	used by Ball et al. in 2020 and AddPhon in 2025
β	turned Greek beta	voiced bilabial frictionless continuant	β̞	para-IPA
(δ)	small capital Greek delta	mid back unrounded vowel	ɤ̞	Proposed by Trager (1964)
(δ)	small capital Greek delta	voiced dental frictionless continuant	ð̞	proposed in 2011
ƌ or б	small capital d with top bar or reversed Cyrillic be	voiced dental frictionless continuant	ð̞	proposed in 2011
ð	reversed eth	voiced dental frictionless continuant	ð̞	used by Ball et al. in 2020 and AddPhon in 2025
ð	turned eth	voiced dental frictionless continuant	ð̞	proposed in 2010
ᴆ	small capital eth	voiced dental frictionless continuant	ð̞	proposed in 2010
ᴆ	small capital eth	partially-devoiced dental fricative	ð̥	used by Uralicists; in the case of the fricative, the form used was actually struck all the way through the bowl, as in ⟨ᴅ̶⟩ (~~ᴅ~~), but was encoded into Unicode as a single letter with the tap
ᴆ	small capital eth	voiceless alveolar tap and flap	ɾ̥	used by Uralicists; in the case of the fricative, the form used was actually struck all the way through the bowl, as in ⟨ᴅ̶⟩ (~~ᴅ~~), but was encoded into Unicode as a single letter with the tap
σ	small capital reversed Greek sigma	voiced alveolar frictionless continuant	z̞	proposed in 2011; in response, Recasens (2011) rejected the need for special symbols in favor of simply using the diacritic for lowering, while maintaining a distinction between the rhotic [ɹ] and frictionless continuant [z̞]
ƨ	reversed s	voiced alveolar frictionless continuant	z̞	proposed in 2011; in response, Recasens (2011) rejected the need for special symbols in favor of simply using the diacritic for lowering, while maintaining a distinction between the rhotic [ɹ] and frictionless continuant [z̞]
𝽦 (z)	reversed z	voiced alveolar frictionless continuant	z̞	used by Ball et al. in 2020 and AddPhon in 2025
ʑ	reversed z with curl	voiced alveolo-palatal frictionless continuant	ʑ̞	used by Ball for AddPhon in 2025
ƹ	reversed ezh	voiced pharyngeal fricative	ʕ	it is based on the Arabic letter ʿayn (ع) instead of letter ezh, used in Arabic and Ethiopic transcriptions
ƹ	reversed ezh	voiced postalveolar frictionless continuant	ʒ̞	proposed in 2011; used by Ball et al. in 2020
ᶎ	reversed z with retroflex hook	voiced retroflex frictionless continuant	ʐ̞	used by Ball et al. in 2020 and AddPhon in 2025
ȥ	z with hook	voiceless dental sibilant	s̪	Old High German studies
J	capital inverted J	voiced palatal frictionless continuant	ʝ̞	proposed in 2011; in response, Recasens (2011) rejected the need for special symbols in favor of simply using the diacritic for lowering, while maintaining a distinction between the semivowel [j] and frictionless continuant [ʝ̞] (called a spirant approximant by Martínez-Celdrán [2004], who made the same transcription recommendation)
ʝ	reversed curly-tail j	voiced palatal frictionless continuant	ʝ̞	used by Ball et al. in 2020 and AddPhon in 2025
ᴦ	small capital Greek gamma	voiced velar frictionless continuant	ɣ̞	proposed in 2011; in response, Recasens (2011) rejected the need for special symbols in favor of simply using the diacritic for lowering, while maintaining a distinction between the semivowel [ɰ] and frictionless continuant [ɣ̞] (called a spirant approximant by Martínez-Celdrán [2004], who made the same transcription recommendation)
ɣ	inverted Latin gamma	voiced velar frictionless continuant	ɣ̞	used by Ball et al. in 2020 and AddPhon in 2025
ʁ̢ or ʁ̨	small capital inverted r with hook	voiced uvular approximant	ʁ̞	proposed in 1989, rejected
	small capital inverted R with left arm	voiced uvular approximant	ʁ̞	proposed in 1989, rejected
ρ	Greek rho	voiced bilabial trill	ʙ	proposed by Heffner (1950) before ⟨ʙ⟩ was officially adopted
ϱ	cursive Greek rho	voiced uvular trill	ʀ	used by Uralicists
ᴩ	small capital Greek rho	voiceless uvular trill	ʀ̥	used by Uralicists
ᴙ	small capital reversed r	voiceless uvular trill	ʀ̥	appears sporadically in historical charts
ᴙ	small capital reversed r	voiced epiglottal trill	ʢ	proposed for extIPA in 2018, used by Ball for AddPhon in 2025
ᴙ	small capital reversed r	voiced uvular approximant	ʁ̞	proposed in 2011
ᴚ	small capital turned r	voiced uvular approximant	ʁ̞	proposed in 2011; used by Ball et al. in 2020 and AddPhon in 2025
ᴚ	small capital turned r	voiceless uvular fricative	χ / ꭓ	replacement introduced in 1921, officially replaced in 1928
ʖ	inverted glottal stop	alveolar lateral click	ǁ	removed 1989; see click letters, but some African languages still use this symbol to avoid confusion with ⟨‖⟩ (major break)
ʖ	inverted glottal stop	voiced pharyngeal approximant	ʕ̞	proposed in 2011
ʔ	turned glottal stop	voiced pharyngeal approximant	ʕ̞	used by Ball et al. in 2020 and AddPhon in 2025
9	digit nine	voiced pharyngeal approximant	ʕ̞	Proposed by Smalley (1963)
ʢ or ƾ	turned glottal stop with stroke	voiced epiglottal approximant	ʢ̞	used by Ball for AddPhon in 2025
ɦ	reversed h with hook	voiced glottal approximant	ɦ̞	used by Ball for AddPhon in 2025
h	reversed h	(strong) voiceless glottal fricative	h͈	suggested by Ball for AddPhon in 2025
	gamma with left hook	voiced prevelar fricative	ɣ᫈	Proposed by Trager (1964)
	gamma with right hook	voiced postvelar or uvular fricative	ɣ᫢ or ʁ	Proposed by Trager (1964)
,, (ǥ)	single-loop g with stroke	voiced velar fricative	ɣ	replaced double-loop ⟨g⟩ in 1900, then replaced by gamma ⟨ɣ⟩ in 1931; between that time, the letter took on slightly different shapes, with the stroke going from diagonal to horizontal. The character ⟨ǥ⟩ may not have the single-loop shape in some fonts, and may also have the stroke at the bowl instead of the descender
(ɡ̶ or ~~g~~)	g with bowl stroke	voiced velar fricative	ɣ	Occasional Americanist usage
γ	Greek gamma	voiced velar fricative	ɣ	a mistake, typewriter substitution or similarity of shape; also used by Americanists and Uralicists
	hooktop ezh	voiced velar fricative	ɣ	proposed in 1989, rejected
ƣ	gha	voiced velar fricative	ɣ	Romanization in Turkic languages
(g)	double-loop g	voiced velar fricative	ɣ	used in the early alphabet from 1895 to 1900; replaced with [ǥ] in the 1900 chart
(g)	double-loop g	voiced velar plosive	ɡ	standard Unicode Basic Latin/ASCII lower-case ⟨g⟩ (U+0067) may have a double-loop g glyph. The preferred IPA single-loop ⟨g⟩ (U+0261) is in the IPA Extensions Unicode block. For a time it was proposed that the double-loop g might be used for [ɡ] and the single-loop g for [ɡ̟] (⟨ᶃ⟩), but the distinction never caught on. See 1948 merger
ʆ	curly-tail esh	palatalized voiceless palato-alveolar fricative or voiceless alveolo-palatal fricative	ʃʲ or ɕ	variant, also for Russian ⟨щ⟩; removed 1989
ʆ	curly-tail esh	voiceless laminal closed postalveolar sibilant (hissing-hushing)	ʃ̻͆	occasional modern usage
ᵷ	turned g (double-loop)	voiceless laminal closed postalveolar sibilant (hissing-hushing)	ʃ̻͆	used in the 1900 chart, 1904 & 1921 supplementary materials
ŝ	s with circumflex	voiceless laminal closed postalveolar sibilant (hissing-hushing)	ʃ̻͆	used by Catford; proposed in 1989, rejected
ʓ	curly-tail ezh	palatalized voiced palato-alveolar fricative or voiced alveolo-palatal fricative	ʒʲ or ʑ	variant, removed 1989
ʓ	curly-tail ezh	voiced laminal closed postalveolar sibilant (hissing-hushing)	ʒ̻͆	occasional modern usage
ʒ	turned ezh	voiced laminal closed postalveolar sibilant (hissing-hushing)	ʒ̻͆	used in the 1900 chart, 1904 & 1921 supplementary materials
ẑ	z with circumflex	voiced laminal closed postalveolar sibilant (hissing-hushing)	ʒ̻͆	used by Catford; proposed in 1989, rejected
ȶ, ȡ, ȵ, ȴ	curly-tail t, d, n, l	alveolo-palatal consonants	c̟, ɟ᫈, ɲ᫈, ʎ̟ or t̠ʲ, d̠ʲ, n̠ʲ, l̠ʲ	used by some Sinologists; also used by Ball for AddPhon in 2025
𝼍 𝼏 𝼎 𝼌	curly-tail click letters	nasal clicks	ǀ̃ ǃ̃ ǁ̃ ǂ̃ or ᵑǀ ᵑǃ ᵑǁ ᵑǂ	Used by Beach (1938)
ꬺ	m with crossed-tail	voiced labiodental nasal	ɱ	used in Teuthonista
ꬻ	n with crossed-tail	voiced velar nasal	ŋ	used in Teuthonista, Dania, and Anthropos
ꬼ	eng with crossed-tail	voiced palatal or velar nasal	ɲ or ŋ	Used in Teuthonista
ř	r with caron	voiced alveolar fricative trill	r̝	Intended for ř in Czech and related languages; replaced in 1947
ɼ	long-leg r	voiced alveolar fricative trill	r̝	Introduced in 1947, withdrawn 1989; used by Ball for AddPhon in 2025
ɼ	long-leg r	syllabic alveolar trill	r̩	a mistake
r or ɹ	inverted r	voiced alveolar or postalveolar rhotic fricative	ɹ̝ or ɹ̝᫢	used by Ball et al. in 2020 and AddPhon in 2025
ɹ̡ or 𝼕	inverted r with retroflex hook	voiced retroflex rhotic fricative	ɻ̝	used by Ball et al. in 2020 and AddPhon in 2025
	turned r with left retroflex hook	voiced retroflex rhotic fricative	ɻ̝	Proposed by Ball (2026)
ꜧ	heng	voiced alveolar lateral fricative	ɮ	replaced ⟨ɮ⟩ in 1938; the letter has had a multitude of values in other phonetic transcription systems, see ⟨ꜧ⟩
	l–yogh ligature	voiced alveolar lateral fricative	ɮ	compromise form of ⟨ɮ⟩ and ⟨ꜧ⟩ used from 1947 until 1989
or	hooktop h–yogh or hooktop h–ezh ligature	breathy-voiced alveolo-palatal fricative	ʑ̤	combined form of ⟨ɦ⟩ and ⟨ʒ⟩ used by Doke (1927)
𝽧	curly-tail l–ezh ligature	palatalized voiced alveolar lateral fricative	ɮʲ	used by Doke (1931)
	turned y with reversed belt	voiceless palatal lateral fricative	𝼆	proposed in 1989, rejected
ʎᴊ	small capital J–turned y ligature	voiced palatal lateral fricative	ʎ̝ or 𝼆̬	proposed in 1989, rejected
ʎʒ	turned y–ezh ligature	voiced palatal lateral fricative	ʎ̝ or 𝼆̬	used by Ball for AddPhon in 2025
ʟʒ	small capital l–ezh ligature	voiced velar lateral fricative	ʟ̝ or 𝼄̬	used by Ball for AddPhon in 2025
ɮ	reversed l–ezh ligature	voiced velar lateral fricative	ʟ̝ or 𝼄̬	proposed in 1989, rejected
(ɬ)	reversed l with belt	voiceless velar lateral fricative	𝼄	proposed in 1989, rejected
Ꙫ	uppercase Cyrillic o with two dots inside	nasal-ingressive velic trill	𝼀↓	a paralinguistic impression of a snort, due to the graphic resemblance to a pig snout
ђ	Cyrillic dje	voiced pharyngeal nasal		used by Sinologists; it is debated whether such a sound is physically possible to produce
♀	feminine sign	voiced pharyngeal plosive	𝼂	Proposed by Trager (1964)
⚲	neuter sign	voiceless pharyngeal plosive	ꞯ	Proposed by Trager (1964)
ᴅ	small capital d	voiced alveolar tap and flap	ɾ	used by Americanists
ᴅ	small capital d	postalveolar "slight retroflexed" trill	𐞨r̠	Proposed in 1989, rejected; reportedly in Nias language
ᴅ	small capital d	lenis alveolar plosive	d̥	used by Uralicists
ᴃ	small capital barred b	partially-devoiced bilabial fricative	β̥	used by Uralicists
ᴊ	small capital j	voiceless palatal approximant	j̊	used by Uralicists
ᴊ	small capital j	voiced palatal fricative	ʝ	Used by Catford (1982 [1977], 1994 [1988])
ᴌ	small capital l with stroke	voiceless velarized alveolar lateral approximant	ɫ̥	used by Uralicists
ᴫ	small capital Cyrillic el	voiceless velar lateral approximant	ʟ̥	used by Uralicists
ᴎ	small capital reversed n or engma	voiceless velar nasal	ŋ̊	used by Uralicists
ᴤ	voiced laryngeal spirant	voiced glottal fricative	ɦ	used by Uralicists
ᴥ	Latin ain	glottal stop	ʔ	used by Uralicists
ʟ	small capital l	voiced linguolabial lateral approximant	l̼	Used by PRDS Group (1983), suggested by Ball (1987); ⟨ʟ⟩ was approved for its current placement in 1989
ʟ	reversed small capital l	voiced labial lateral approximant	β̞ˡ	Proposed by Trager (1964); it is debated whether such a sound is physically possible to produce
λ or ꟛ	Greek lambda or Latin lambda	voiced palatal lateral approximant	ʎ	a mistake or typewriter substitution
λ or ꟛ	Greek lambda or Latin lambda	voiced alveolar lateral affricate	d͡ɮ	used by Americanists
ƛ	barred lambda	voiceless alveolar lateral affricate	t͡ɬ	used by Americanists
ł	l with stroke	voiceless alveolar lateral fricative	ɬ	used by Americanists, also a typographic substitute
ł	l with stroke	voiced velarized alveolar lateral approximant (dark l)	ɫ / lˠ	used by Uralicists and in Baltic transcriptions
ꬸ	l with double middle tilde	voiced pharyngealized alveolar lateral approximant (strongly dark l)	ɫ / lˤ	used in Teuthonista alongside ⟨ꬷ⟩ (weakly dark l), forming a three-degree cline of ⟨ꬷ ɫ ꬸ⟩; para-IPA, by extension of the conventional doubling for a greater degree
ꬹ	l with middle ring	palatalized voiced alveolar lateral	lʲ	Used in Teuthonista, specifically denoting "wide" or "broad" palatalization and narrow lateral openings
ƒ	f with hook	voiceless labiodental fricative	f	homoglyphic in many italic fonts
ƒ	f with hook	voiceless bilabial fricative	ɸ	used in Ewe transcriptions and in the Africa Alphabet
ᵽ or p̶ (~~p~~)	p with middle stroke	voiceless bilabial fricative	ɸ	used by Americanists
(ᵽ, b̶, ~~b~~)	b with middle stroke	voiced bilabial fricative	β	used by Americanists
b̸	b with solidus	voiced bilabial fricative	β	used by Americanists
(d̶, ᵽ, ~~d~~)	d with middle stroke	voiced dental fricative	ð	used by Americanists
d̸ or (d̶ or ~~d~~)	d with solidus	voiced dental fricative	ð	used by Americanists
š	s with caron	voiceless postalveolar or retroflex fricative	ʃ or ʂ	used by Americanists and Uralicists; also seen in the romanization of some Semitic and Slavic languages
ž	z with caron	voiced postalveolar or retroflex fricative	ʒ or ʐ	used by Americanists and Uralicists; also seen in the romanization of some Semitic and Slavic languages
č	c with caron	voiceless postalveolar or retroflex affricate	t͡ʃ or ʈ͡ʂ	used by Americanists and Uralicists; also seen in the romanization of some Semitic and Slavic languages
ǰ	j with caron	voiced postalveolar or retroflex affricate	d͡ʒ or ɖ͡ʐ	used by Americanists
ǧ	g with caron	voiced postalveolar or retroflex affricate	d͡ʒ or ɖ͡ʐ	seen in the romanization of some Semitic languages
ǯ	ezh with caron	voiced postalveolar or retroflex affricate	d͡ʒ or ɖ͡ʐ	used by Uralicists
𝼞	curly-tail s	voiceless alveolo-palatal fricative	ɕ	used by Roos (1998, 2000) in an Americanist system; under this convention, ⟨c č 𝼝 ɕ⟩ corresponds to ⟨ts tš tʂ t𝼞⟩ = Americanist ⟨c č c̣ ć⟩ = IPA ⟨ts tʃ tʂ tɕ⟩. The voiced equivalents are ⟨ʒ ǯ ᶚ ʓ⟩ under this convention, corresponding to ⟨dz dž dʐ dʑ⟩ = Americanist ⟨dz ǰ dẓ dź⟩ = IPA ⟨dz dʒ dʐ dʑ⟩.
𝼝	c with retroflex hook	voiceless retroflex affricate	ʈ͡ʂ	used by Roos (1998, 2000) in an Americanist system; under this convention, ⟨c č 𝼝 ɕ⟩ corresponds to ⟨ts tš tʂ t𝼞⟩ = Americanist ⟨c č c̣ ć⟩ = IPA ⟨ts tʃ tʂ tɕ⟩. The voiced equivalents are ⟨ʒ ǯ ᶚ ʓ⟩ under this convention, corresponding to ⟨dz dž dʐ dʑ⟩ = Americanist ⟨dz ǰ dẓ dź⟩ = IPA ⟨dz dʒ dʐ dʑ⟩.
ć ĺ ń ś ź dź	c l n s z dz with acute accent	alveolo-palatal or palatal/postalveolar consonants	t͡ɕ l̠ʲ n̠ʲ ɕ ʑ d͡ʑ or t͡ʃ ʎ ɲ ʃ ʒ d͡ʒ	used by Slavicists, Uralicists, and Americanists
ꝁ	k with bar	voiceless velar fricative	x	Used by Meillet & Cohen (1952)
ẋ	x with dot	voiceless uvular fricative	χ	used by Americanists
ᴋ	small capital k	voiceless uvular plosive	q	proposed in 1925, rejected; analogous to other uvulars marked with small capitals
(ℜ)	blackletter R	voiced uvular flap	ɢ̆	Proposed in 1989, rejected; deemed too complicated for dot-matrix printing
	baby gamma	close-mid back unrounded vowel	ɤ	used from 1921 to 1989, replaced by ramshorn to avoid confusion with gamma; U+0264 ɤ LATIN SMALL LETTER RAMS HORN now represents both glyphs
0, (0̷), or Ø	digit zero, slashed digit zero or uppercase slashed o	null onset or zero phone	∅	usually used in phonology to mean a spelling with no sound value. however, in Chinese and some Korean linguistics, some scholars use it for a weak glottal stop; the sound value of the first consonant of syllables started by a vowel.
ƥ ƭ 𝼉 ƈ ƙ ʠ	hooktop p, t, ʈ, c, k, q	voiceless implosives	ɓ̥ ɗ̥ ᶑ̊ ʄ̊ ɠ̊ ʛ̥ or pʼ↓ tʼ↓ ʈʼ↓ cʼ↓ kʼ↓ qʼ↓	brief additions to the IPA, removed 1993; used by Ball for AddPhon in 2025
ʇ	turned t	dental click	ǀ	removed 1989; see click letters, but in some African languages still use this symbol to avoid confusion with ⟨l⟩ (voiced alveolar lateral approximant) and/or ⟨|⟩ (minor break)
ʗ	stretched c	alveolar click	ǃ	removed 1989; see click letters
ʗ	stretched c	voiced retroflex flap	ɽ	some assumed this symbol was made by combining ⟨ɾ⟩ with ⟨◌̢⟩ and thus was used as the symbol for voiced retroflex flap [ɽ]; ⟨ɽ⟩ assumed as the symbol of voiced retroflex trill [ɽr].
ʗ	reversed stretched c	palatal or laminal click	ǂ	Proposed in 1989, rejected
ʞ	turned k	originally a palatal click, reinterpreted as a back-released velar click		Used in the Anthropos phonetic alphabet for a 'velar' click. Adopted by Jones for a palatal click for the 1921 chart; later comments show he interpreted this sound as velar. A click with a forward velar release was later judged impossible, and the symbol was therefor retired from the IPA. For several years it was used in extIPA for a velodorsal stop, but this was changed to ⟨𝼃⟩ (⟨k⟩) when it was resurrected for the para-lexical back-released click.
ᴋ or 𝼐	small capital reversed k	wildcard for any consonant	C	suggested in 1949
(ᴜ)	small capital inverted u	wildcard for any vowel	V	suggested in 1949
	double barred dotless j	voiced palatal implosive	ʄ	Proposed in 1989, rejected
(ȷ̒)	j with top hook	voiced palatal implosive	ʄ	Used by Smalley (1963)
𝼋 (⨎)	esh with two bars	voiced palatal implosive	ʄ	old form of ⟨ʄ⟩
𝼋 (⨎)	esh with two bars	fricated palatal click	ǂǂ or ǃ͡s	uncommon letter in Ekoka !Kung transcription
ȣ	ou ligature	close-mid back unrounded vowel or voiced velar fricative	ɤ or ɣ	a mistake
ɿ	reversed r with fishhook	syllabic denti-alveolar approximant	ɹ̪̍, ɹ̟̍, z̪̍, z̞̍, or ◌͡ɯ	used by Sinologists, and by Japanologists specifically for the Miyako and Tarama languages.
℩	turned iota	syllabic denti-alveolar approximant	ɹ̪̍, ɹ̟̍, z̪̍, z̞̍, or ◌͡ɯ	old form of ⟨ɿ⟩, used by Sinologists, and by Japanologists specifically for the Miyako and Tarama languages.
ʅ	squat reversed esh	syllabic retroflex approximant	ɹ̠̍, ɻ̍, ʐ̍, ʐ̞̍, or ◌͡ɨ	used by Sinologists. See Chinese vowels
ʃ or ꭍ	reversed (baseline) esh	syllabic retroflex approximant	ɹ̠̍, ɻ̍, ʐ̍, ʐ̞̍, or ◌͡ɨ	old form of ⟨ʅ⟩, used by Sinologists. See Chinese vowels
ʮ	turned h with fishhook	labialized syllabic denti-alveolar approximant	ɹ̩ʷ, z̩ʷ, or ◌͡u	used by Sinologists
ʯ	turned h with fishhook and tail	labialized syllabic retroflex approximant	ɻ̍ʷ, ʐ̍ʷ, or ◌͡ʉ	used by Sinologists
ꭤ	inverted Latin alpha	open back unrounded vowel	ɑ	used by Kurath (1939), where ⟨ɑ⟩ is instead used for the open central unrounded vowel
α	Greek alpha	open back unrounded vowel	ɑ	a mistake; homoglyphic in many sans-serif and italic fonts
α	turned Greek alpha	open back rounded vowel	ɒ	a mistake; homoglyphic in many sans-serif and italic fonts
ꬰ	barred Latin alpha	open central unrounded vowel	ä, ɑ̈, ɐ̞͑, a̠, ɑ̟	Proposed by Charles-James N. Bailey in 1976
ᴀ	small capital a	open central unrounded vowel	ä, ɑ̈, ɐ̞͑, a̠, ɑ̟	used by Sinologists; recommended to and rejected by the IPA multiple times
ᴀ	small capital a	open back unrounded vowel	ɑ	Early historical usage from the description of French in the pre-1900 founding alphabet charts
ᴀ	small capital a	devoiced open back unrounded vowel	ɑ̥	used by Uralicists
ᴁ	small capital æ	devoiced near-open front unrounded vowel	æ̥	used by Uralicists
𝽫	reversed a	near-open front unrounded vowel	æ	Proposed in 1949 and 1989, rejected; suggested as ⟨a⟩ and ⟨ɑ⟩ are commonly conflated graphically. Had the proposals been accepted, ⟨æ⟩ would have been re-identified as the value for [a], to allow for such conflations without issue; both ⟨a⟩ and ⟨ɑ⟩ would have represented [ɑ].
ꜵ	ao ligature	open central unrounded vowel	ä, ɑ̈, ɐ̞͑, a̠, ɑ̟	Used by Leoni & Maturi (2002)
ꜵ	ao ligature	near-open front rounded vowel	œ̞	Proposed by Trager (1964)
(Ꜵ)	small capital ao ligature	open front rounded vowel	ɶ	Proposed by Trager (1964)
(ᴀ)	small capital turned a	close-mid back unrounded vowel	ɤ	replacement introduced in 1921, officially replaced in 1928
(ᴀ)	small capital turned a	near-open central unrounded vowel	ɜ̞	Proposed by Trager (1964)
E	uppercase e	mid front unrounded vowel	e̞, ɛ̝	Used by some Koreanists, where in many dialects there is no phonemic differentiation between /e/ (RR e; Hangul ㅔ) and /ɛ ~ æ/ (RR ae; Hangul ㅐ). In the Gyeongsang dialects, a parallel case historically existed with a lack of differentiation between /ʌ/ (RR eo; Hangul ㅓ) and /ɨ ~ ɯ/ (RR eu; Hangul ㅡ), sometimes written with an uppercase reversed ⟨Ǝ⟩; however, the exact phonetic value of this vowel varies in different reports (unlike ⟨E⟩, which is rather consistent), and the merger is disappearing in younger speakers, though still present in older speakers.
ᴇ	small capital e	mid front unrounded vowel	e̞, ɛ̝	Proposed by Bloch & Trager (1942); used by Sinologists
ᴇ	small capital e	close-mid front unrounded vowel	e	Early historical usage from the description of French in the pre-1900 founding alphabet charts
ᴇ	small capital e	devoiced close-mid front unrounded vowel	e̥	used by Uralicists
ⱻ	small capital turned e	devoiced mid central vowel	ə̥	used by Uralicists
ꬳ	barred e	close-mid central unrounded vowel	ɘ	used by Teuthonista
ε	Greek epsilon	open-mid front unrounded vowel	ɛ	a mistake, typewriter substitution or similarity of shape; homoglyphic in most fonts
ϵ	lunate epsilon	open-mid front unrounded vowel	ɛ	occasional usage as a typographic variant
϶	reversed lunate epsilon	open-mid central unrounded vowel	ɜ	occasional usage as a typographic variant
ʚ	closed Latin epsilon	open-mid central rounded vowel	ɞ	appears sporadically in historical charts (1907, 1921, 1926); considered a typographical error when reinstituted 1993, corrected in 1996
(ꞓ or ~~ɔ~~)	turned c with bar or barred open o	open-mid central rounded vowel	ɞ	originally proposed by Trager (1964), later proposed by Catford in 1989 and 1990
(ω or ო)	turned omega	near-open central rounded vowel	ɞ̞	Proposed by Trager (1964)
ɩ	Latin iota	near-close front unrounded vowel	ɪ̟, i̞, e̝	repurposed by Sinologists
ɩ	Latin iota	near-close near-front unrounded vowel	ɪ	longstanding alternate symbol until 1989
ı	dotless small i	near-close near-front unrounded vowel	ɪ	a mistake or typographic substitute; occasionally used by Americanists
ı	dotless small i	close front unrounded vowel	i	placeholder for modified sound, by placing diacritic above (e.g. /ı̽/, /ȷ̊/).
ȷ	dotless small j	voiced palatal approximant	j	placeholder for modified sound, by placing diacritic above (e.g. /ı̽/, /ȷ̊/).
ᵻ	barred small capital i	near-close central unrounded vowel (schwi)	ɪ̈, ɨ̞, ɘ̝, ɪ̠	an analogous combination of ⟨ɪ⟩ and ⟨ɨ⟩, two vowels of which it lies between; used by some English phoneticians and dictionaries (such as the Oxford English Dictionary, where it may be more broadly described as any obscure vowel between [i ~ ɪ ~ ə], and called schwi); Americanist notation
ᵼ	barred Latin iota	near-close central unrounded vowel (schwi)	ɪ̈, ɨ̞, ɘ̝, ɪ̠	used by Slavicists
(^{ɪ}_{ə})	small capital i over schwa	near-close central unrounded vowel (schwi)	ɪ̈, ɨ̞, ɘ̝, ɪ̠	used by some English phoneticians and dictionaries (such as the Longman Dictionary of Contemporary English); may be more broadly described as any obscure vowel between [i ~ ɪ ~ ə]
ə̇	dotted schwa	near-close central unrounded vowel (schwi)	ɪ̈, ɨ̞, ɘ̝, ɪ̠	used in Webster's Third; may be more broadly described as any obscure vowel between [i ~ ɪ ~ ə]
ꝋ	barred o	close-mid central rounded vowel	ɵ	variant shape of ⟨ɵ⟩ in some early 20th century works.
(ꭥ̶ or ᵿ)	barred small capital omega	mid central rounded vowel	ɵ̞	Proposed by Trager (1964)
ꭥ (ʊ or ω)	small capital omega	mid back rounded vowel	o̞, ɔ̝	Proposed by Bloch & Trager (1942)
o̧	o with cedilla	mid back rounded vowel	o̞, ɔ̝	used by Sinologists
ⱺ	o with low ring inside	mid back rounded vowel	o̞, ɔ̝	used in the Swedish Dialect Alphabet
ꝏ	double o ligature	near-close back rounded vowel	ʊ̠	Used for the Massachusett language, representing a sound similar to French ⟨ou⟩
ᴏ	small capital o	devoiced close-mid or open-mid back rounded vowel	o̥ or ɔ̥	used by Uralicists
ᴐ	small capital open o	devoiced open-mid back rounded vowel	ɔ̥	used by Uralicists
ↄ	reversed c	open-mid back rounded vowel	ɔ	a mistake or similarity of shape; homoglyphic in many fonts
ꭢ	open o–e ligature	open-mid front rounded vowel	œ	Proposed by Trager (1964)
ұ	Cyrillic straight U with stroke	near-close near-back unrounded vowel	ɯ̽ or ʊ̜	used in Mande studies
ъ	Cyrillic hard sign	near-close near-back unrounded vowel	ɯ̽ or ʊ̜	Proposed by Trager (1964)
ω or ꞷ	Greek or Latin omega	near-close near-back unrounded vowel	ɯ̽ or ʊ̜	Used by Wells (1982), by analogy of the obsolete ⟨ɷ⟩ symbol
ω or ꞷ	Greek or Latin omega	voiced bilabial, under-rounded, or compressed labial–velar approximant	β̞ or w̜ or w᫦ / ɰ᫧	Used by the Phonetic Society of Japan between 1938–1955 to transcribe Japanese /w/, of which the precise phonetic value remains disputed
ω or ꞷ	Greek or Latin omega	near-open back rounded vowel	ɒ̝, ɔ̞	Proposed by Bloch & Trager (1942); used by Sinologists
ω or ꞷ	Greek or Latin omega	near-close back rounded vowel	ʊ̠, u̞, o̝	used in the phonetic description of the General Alphabet of Cameroon Languages
ɷ	closed Latin omega	near-close back rounded vowel	ʊ̠, u̞, o̝	repurposed by Sinologists
ɷ	closed Latin omega	near-close near-back rounded vowel	ʊ	longstanding alternate symbol until 1989
ᴜ	small capital u	near-close near-back rounded vowel	ʊ	Americanist notation; also the shape of ⟨ʊ⟩ in the original 1900 chart, reused in the 1921 chart
ᴜ	small capital u	devoiced close back rounded vowel	u̥	used by Uralicists
	half barred u	close central rounded vowel	ʉ	Proposed by Trager (1964)
ꞹ	u with stroke	close central rounded vowel	ʉ	Occasional typographical variant
ᵿ	barred Latin upsilon	near-close central rounded vowel (schwu)	ʊ̈, ʉ̞, ɵ̝, ʊ̟	an analogous combination of ⟨ʊ⟩ and ⟨ʉ⟩, two vowels of which it lies between; used by some English phoneticians and dictionaries (such as the Oxford English Dictionary, where it may be more broadly described as any obscure vowel between [u ~ ʊ ~ ə], and called schwu)
𝽓	barred closed Latin omega	near-close central rounded vowel (schwu)	ʊ̈, ʉ̞, ɵ̝, ʊ̟	an analogous combination of ⟨ɷ⟩ and ⟨ʉ⟩
ᵾ	barred small capital u	near-close central rounded vowel (schwu)	ʊ̈, ʉ̞, ɵ̝, ʊ̟	Americanist notation
(^{ʊ}_{ə})	small capital Latin upsilon over schwa	near-close central rounded vowel (schwu)	ʊ̈, ʉ̞, ɵ̝, ʊ̟	used by some English phoneticians and dictionaries (such as the Longman Dictionary of Contemporary English); may be more broadly described as any obscure vowel between [u ~ ʊ ~ ə]
υ	Greek upsilon	voiced labiodental approximant	ʋ	a mistake or typographic substitute
(ɯ̶ or ~~ɯ~~)	turned m with bar	close central unrounded vowel	ɨ	Proposed by Ball (2026) as an alternative equivalent
ᵫ	u–e ligature	close front rounded vowel or near-close near-front rounded vowel	y or ʏ	used by some English dictionaries such as Merriam-Webster
ɏ	barred y	close central compressed vowel	ÿ	para-IPA, by analogy of central ⟨i u⟩ being transcribed as ⟨ɨ ʉ⟩; used by Ball for AddPhon in 2025
ɏ or ʏ̵ (~~ʏ~~)	small capital barred y	near-close central compressed vowel	ʏ̈	para-IPA, by analogy of central ⟨ɪ ʊ⟩ being transcribed as ⟨ᵻ ᵿ⟩
ɉ	barred j	voiced post-palatal approximant	ȷ̈ or ɰ̈	used by Ball et al. (2011, 2020, 2025)
(ɰ̶ or ~~ɰ~~)	turned m with long leg and bar	voiced post-palatal approximant	ȷ̈ or ɰ̈	Proposed by Ball (2026) as an alternative equivalent to para-IPA ⟨ɉ⟩
𝼾	barred turned h	compressed post-palatal approximant	ɥ̈	used by Ball et al. (2011, 2025)
𝼿	barred w	protruded post-palatal approximant	ẅ	used by Ball et al. (2020, 2025)
B G H I L N Œ Q R Y	uppercase letters	small caps	ʙ ɢ ʜ ɪ ʟ ɴ ɶ ꞯ ʀ ʏ	often mistaken, typographic substitute
H	uppercase h	long vowel (chōonpu)	ː	used by Japanologists to represent a phonemic long vowel, such as /aH/ or /aR/
R	uppercase r	long vowel (chōonpu)	ː	used by Japanologists to represent a phonemic long vowel, such as /aH/ or /aR/
Q	uppercase q	long consonant (sokuon)	ː	used by Japanologists; typically marks gemination, but may also be realized as a glottal stop [ʔ] in certain contexts
X	uppercase x	voiceless uvular fricative	χ	a mistake or typographic substitute
Y	uppercase y	voiced labial–palatal approximant	ɥ	a mistake or typographic substitute
ƞ	n with long right leg	moraic nasal (hatsuon)	m, ɰ̃, ɴ, etc.	Intended for the moraic nasal of Japanese; withdrawn 1976. Now often written by Japanologists as an uppercase /N/ (common wildcard for nasal consonants).
ƞ	n with long right leg	voiced velar nasal	ŋ	used by Uralicists and in Dania transcription
η	Greek eta	voiced velar nasal	ŋ	a mistake or typographic substitute (historically very common in typewriter usage)
ⱴ	v with curl	labiodental flap	ⱱ	historically used before ⟨ⱱ⟩ was officially adopted by the IPA in 2005
v̶ (~~v~~)	barred v	labiodental flap	ⱱ	used in the phonetic description of the General Alphabet of Cameroon Languages, associated with the grapheme ⟨vb⟩
ⱳ	w with hook	bilabial flap	ⱱ̟ or b̮	para-IPA, by analogy of ⟨ⱱ⟩ for the labiodental equivalent. In literature, this sound has often been transcribed as ⟨w̆⟩, also by analogy of the labiodental formerly being transcribed as ⟨v̆⟩; see bilabial flap for further examples and explanation
ⱳ	w with hook	glottalic (preglottalized) labial–velar approximant	wˀ, ˀw, ʔw, or w̰	para-IPA, by analogy of the right-swinging top hook for implosives. Used in several African alphabets; see w with hook and y with hook for examples
ƴ	y with hook	glottalic (preglottalized) palatal approximant	jˀ, ˀj, ʔj, or j̰	para-IPA, by analogy of the right-swinging top hook for implosives. Used in several African alphabets; see w with hook and y with hook for examples
	turned m with fishhook and curl	voiced labial–velar approximant	w	Proposed in 1989, rejected; in this scheme, ⟨w⟩ would become a fricative, parallel to the relationship between ⟨v⟩ and ⟨ʋ⟩
w̸	w with stroke	compressed labial–velar approximant	ɣ̞ᵝ or w᫦	used by Monzón & Seneff (1984) for some Nahuatl dialects
𝼑	l with fishhook	alveolar lateral flap	ɺ	historical alternate used in transcriptions before the official adoption of ⟨ɺ⟩ by the IPA; also in the Anthropos phonetic alphabet
𝼈	turned r with long leg and retroflex hook	retroflex lateral flap	ɭ̆	para-IPA, a combination of ⟨ɺ⟩ and ⟨ɻ⟩; used by Ball for AddPhon in 2025
ᶑ	d with hook and tail	voiced retroflex implosive		para-IPA, a combination of ⟨ɗ⟩ and ⟨ɖ⟩; common, but not explicitly approved in IPA
ᶘ ᶚ	esh and ezh with retroflex hook	laminal retroflex fricatives	ʂ̻ ʐ̻ or ʂ̠ ʐ̠	used by Laver (1994) for Polish ⟨sz ż⟩ and Russian ⟨ш ж⟩; described as retroflex palato-alveolar by Diehl (1995), which may be impossible to pronounce according to Ladefoged
k′, t′, etc.	prime	palatalization	kʲ, tʲ, etc.	traditional Irish phonology transcription
k', t', etc.	apostrophe	palatalization	kʲ, tʲ, etc.	traditional Russian phonology transcription; also common in X-SAMPA
k’, t’, etc.	right single quotation mark	fortis consonants or faucalized voice	k͈, t͈, etc.	used by some Koreanists for fortis sounds, where the distinction with lenis is not one of voicing; alternatively, interpreted as faucalized phonation; see Korean phonology § Tense
K, T, etc.	uppercase letters	fortis consonants or faucalized voice	k͈, t͈, etc.	used by some Koreanists for fortis sounds, where the distinction with lenis is not one of voicing; alternatively, interpreted as faucalized phonation; see Korean phonology § Tense
k*, t*, etc.	asterisk	fortis consonants or faucalized voice	k͈, t͈, etc.	used by some Koreanists for fortis sounds, where the distinction with lenis is not one of voicing; alternatively, interpreted as faucalized phonation; see Korean phonology § Tense
*	asterisk	syntactic gemination trigger		used in some Italian dictionaries at the end of words which trigger syntactic gemination. Not typically transcribed as simple gemination ⟨ː⟩; see syntactic gemination
k῾, t῾, or kʽ, tʽ, etc.	Greek dasia or modifier letter reversed comma	weak aspiration		seen in the charts of 1926 and 1949 (less common variant)
kʻ, tʻ, etc.	modifier letter turned comma	weak aspiration		seen in the charts of 1921 through 1951 (more common variant)
k˂, t˂, etc.	modifier less than arrow	voiceless implosives	ɠ̊, ɗ̥, etc.	Diacritic intended to be placed on standard voiceless plosives, occasional usage by several authors; also proposed in Pullum (1990) and the subsequent Further Report (1990)
p^{←}, t^{←}, or p ⃖, t ⃖, etc.	modifier left pointer arrow	click consonants	ʘ, ǃ, etc.	Diacritic intended to be placed on standard consonants; used by Smalley (1963) and Samarin (1967)
𝼤 𝼟 ʦ ʣ 𝼢 𝼠 ʧ ʤ ʨ ʥ	ligatures	affricates	t͡θ d͡ð t͡s d͡z t͡ɬ d͡ɮ t͡ʃ d͡ʒ t͡ɕ d͡ʑ	formerly accepted variants
𝼗 𝼒 𝼬 𝼫	ligatures with palatal hook or curly-tail	palatalized affricates	t͡ʃʲ d͡ʒʲ or t͡ɕ d͡ʑ	historical, para-IPA
ꭧ ꭦ 𝼣 𝼡 𝼜 𝼙	ligatures with retroflex hook	retroflex affricates	ʈ͡ʂ̺ ɖ͡ʐ̺ ʈ͡ꞎ ɖ͡𝼅 ʈ͡ʂ̻ ɖ͡ʐ̻ or ʈ͡ʂ ɖ͡ʐ ʈ͡ꞎ ɖ͡𝼅 ʈ͡ʂ̠ ɖ͡ʐ̠	historical, para-IPA
ā, ī, ū, etc.	macron	long vowel	aː, iː, uː, etc.	typically a mistake, though also used in English dictionaries and respelling systems for free ("long") vowels
a:, i:, u:, etc.	colon	long vowel	aː, iː, uː, etc.	typically a mistake or typographic substitution, but preferred by some authors
a̔, e̔, etc.	rough breathing mark	breathy voiced vowel (h-colored)	a̤ / aʱ, e̤ / eʱ, etc.	brief usage in 1949; not in subsequent charts
◌̡	palatal hook	palatalization	◌ʲ	Typically used in the transcription of Slavic languages such as Russian; retired in 1989
◌,	comma	palatalization	◌ʲ	Used by Slavicists
◌̧	combining cedilla	palatalization	◌ʲ	Used as a typographic substitute for the old palatal hook convention ⟨◌̡⟩
◌̧	combining cedilla	lowered	◌̞	Used by Brugmann (1904)
◌̢	retroflex hook	retroflexion		used on consonants when no precomposed character exists
◌̢	retroflex hook	r-colored vowels	ɚ, ɝ, ◌˞	superseded in 1989
	schwa with right hook	r-colored vowels	ɚ, ɝ, ◌˞	Used by Kenyon until 1935, historical variant in IPA; in the Unicode Pipeline, provisionally assigned
	reversed epsilon with right hook	r-colored vowels	ɚ, ɝ, ◌˞	historical variant in IPA
ь	Cyrillic soft sign	epenthetic schwa	◌ᵊ	Used in Indo-European studies for schwa secundum
◌˖, ◌˗	modifier letters plus and minus	advanced, retracted	◌̟ / ◌᫈, ◌̠ / ◌᫢	replaced in 1989; the minus may have serifs, as in ⟨ ɪ ⟩, to distinguish it from a hyphen; now used to avoid a descender, ascender, or another diacritic
◌꭪, ◌꭫	modifier letters left- and right-tack	advanced, retracted	◌̘ / ◌᫠, ◌̙ / ◌᫡	retired in 1912; now used to avoid a descender, ascender, or another diacritic, and sometimes seen with their modern values of advanced and retracted tongue root
◌˔, ◌˕	modifier letters up- and down-tack	raised, lowered	◌̝ / ◌᷵, ◌̞ / ◌᫛	replaced in 1989; now used to avoid a descender, ascender, or another diacritic
◌͔, ◌͕	combining left and right arrowhead below	raised, lowered	◌̝ / ◌᷵, ◌̞ / ◌᫛	proposed in 1925, rejected
◌˂	modifier less than arrow	fronted	◌̟	Occasional usage by several authors
◌͔	combining less than arrow below	fronted	◌̟	Occasional usage by several authors
◌˃	modifier greater than arrow	retracted	◌̠	Occasional usage by several authors
◌͕	combining greater than arrow below	retracted	◌̠	Occasional usage by several authors
◌͕	combining greater than arrow below	pulmonic ingressive	◌↓	Diacritic intended to be placed on standard consonants and vowels; used by Fuller (1990) and Traill (1991)
◌˓, ◌˒	modifier letters left and right half ring	less-rounded, more-rounded	◌̜ / ◌͑, ◌̹ / ◌͗	replaced in 1989; now used to avoid a descender, ascender, or another diacritic
◌ᶹ	superscript v with hook	labialization (compressed)	◌ᵝ	indicates labiodentalization in VoQS; used in some language studies e.g. Swedish and Japanese; recommended in the 1999 Handbook for roundedness lacking both protrusion and velarization
◌ᷩ	combining Latin beta above	labialization (compressed)	◌ᵝ	used to avoid implication of a diphthong
◌͍ ◌⃡	combining left–right arrow below and above	labialization (compressed)	◌ᵝ	extIPA, but intended for spread lips rather than compression
◌ᫀ	combining turned w below	labialization (compressed)	◌ᵝ	may also be used to indicate voiceless labialization ⟨◌ꭩ⟩, instead of compression
◌᫦ ◌᫧	combining double arch below and above	labialization (compressed)	◌ᵝ	added to Unicode in 2025 with this as its intended usage, but not explicitly supported in IPA
◌̫ ◌᫇	combining inverted double arch below and above	labialization (protruded)	◌ʷ	withdrawn 1989
◌ᪿ ◌ᷱ	combining w below and above	labialization (protruded)	◌ʷ	used in some sources, but the rounded version (double arch) is the standard
◌̨	ogonek	nasalization	◌̃	proposed in 1925, rejected; sometimes seen to avoid clash with tone ascender diacritics; used by Americanists
◌̨	ogonek	lowered	◌̞	replaced in 1989; typographic substitutes for ⟨◌̜⟩, which was the intended character (only the adjacent modifier ⟨◌˓⟩ was used for less-rounded at the time)
◌̦	combining reversed comma below	lowered	◌̞	replaced in 1989; typographic substitutes for ⟨◌̜⟩, which was the intended character (only the adjacent modifier ⟨◌˓⟩ was used for less-rounded at the time)
◌᪷	combining open mark below	lowered	◌̞	
◌᪷	combining open mark below	lowered	◌̞	proposed in 1989 for approximated fricatives; supported in preliminary voting, but ultimately rejected in favor of the modern diacritic
◌̭	combining circumflex below	raised	◌̝	proposed in 1989 for fricated approximants, rejected
◌̣	underdot	raised	◌̝	replaced in 1989
◌̣	underdot	retroflexion	◌̢	early historical charts
◌̣	underdot	whispered		never IPA, but picked up by VoQS
◌̦	combining comma below	whispered		appears only in the 1921 chart
◌̇	overdot	palatalization	◌ʲ	withdrawn 1976
‌̚◌, ◌᫩, or ◌˹	open corner	release/burst		listed in the 1999 Handbook as IPA number 490 and AFII code E218, but never adopted into Unicode
◌⸋	raised box	unreleased	◌̚	proposed in 1925, rejected; used where IPA ⟨◌̚⟩ would get confused with the corners used to indicate change of pitch in the Japanese pitch accent system
◌ˉ	modifier minus	unreleased	◌̚	Proposed in 1989, rejected
◌⹁	reversed comma	unreleased	◌̚	Proposed in 1949, rejected
◌˃	modifier greater than arrow	unreleased	◌̚	Used by some Americanists, such as Dunn (1995)
◌° or ◌˚	degree sign or modifier ring	unreleased	◌̚	Proposed in 1989, rejected
◌° or ◌˚	degree sign or modifier ring	labialization	◌ʷ	used by some Americanists and other IPA-adjacent systems
◌᷂	combining snake below	lenis	◌͉	used by Americanists
◌ʱ	modifier h with hook	breathy voice or voiced aspiration	◌̤	implicit, equivalent in the IPA
◌ˀ	modifier glottal stop	creaky voice or glottalization	◌̰	implicit, equivalent in the IPA
(◌≈)	combining double middle tilde	pharyngealization	◌ˤ	Proposed in 1989, rejected
◌𐞴	modifier reversed glottal stop with stroke	pharyngealization or epiglottalization	◌ˤ	used by Ladefoged & Maddieson (1996) and Esling et al. (2019)
◌𐞴	modifier reversed glottal stop with stroke	strident vowel		used by Ladefoged & Maddieson (1990), Exter (2008), and Esling et al. (2019) (overlap with epiglottalization)
◌᷽	combining double tilde below	strident vowel		used by Ladefoged & Maddieson (1996)
◌͌	combining double tilde above	velopharyngeal release	◌𐞐 (◌ᶠᵑ)	former extIPA, replaced in 2024
◌͋	combining homothetic	nareal fricative	◌̾	former extIPA, replaced in 2024
◌_◌	underscore	linking mark	◌‿◌	Proposed in 1989, rejected
¹, ², etc.	superscript digits	pitch accents	ˈ◌̌, ˈ◌̂ or ˈ◌̂, ˈ◌̌	used in Swedish and Norwegian transcriptions
¹, ², etc.	superscript digits	tonal accents	◌́, ◌̌, ◌̀, ◌̂ or ◌̋, ◌᷄, ◌᷉, ◌̂ or similar, or Chao tone letters	used by Sinologists; see tone number
ˉ◌, ˗◌, ˍ◌	Modifier high, mid and low macron behind	high, mid and low-level tone or intonation	◌́, ◌̄, ◌̀ or ˦ ꜓, ˧ ꜔, ˨ ꜕	replaced in 1989
˭◌, ₌◌	Modifier high and low equals sign behind	extra-high and extra-low level tone or intonation	◌̋, ◌̏ or ˥ ꜒, ˩ ꜖	replaced in 1989
ˋ◌, ˴◌, ˎ◌	Modifier high, mid and low grave behind	falling or high falling, mid falling and low falling tone or intonation	◌᷇, ◌᷆ or ˥˧ ꜒꜔, ˦˨ ꜓꜕, ˧˩ ꜔꜖	replaced in 1989
ˊ◌, ˏ◌	Modifier high and low acute behind	high rising and low rising tone or intonation	◌᷄, ◌᷅ or ˧˥ ꜔꜒, ˨˦ ꜕꜓, ˩˧ ꜖꜔	replaced in 1989
ˇ◌, ˬ◌	Modifier high and low caron behind	high dipping and low dipping (falling-rising) tone or intonation	◌᷉ or ˥˧˥ ꜒꜔꜒, ˦˨˦ ꜓꜕꜓, ˧˩˧ ꜔꜖꜔	replaced in 1989
ˆ◌, ꞈ◌	Modifier high and low circumflex behind	peaking (rising-falling) tone or intonation	◌᷈ or ˧˥˨ ꜔꜒꜕, ˨˦˨ ꜕꜓꜕, ˩˧˩ ꜖꜔꜖	replaced in 1989
˜◌, ˷◌	Modifier high and low tilde behind	"wavy" tone or intonation		proposed in 1925, rejected
˙◌, ·◌, .◌	Modifier high, mid and low dot behind	atonic (unaccented) syllable with high, mid, and low pitch; respectively		used by Chao (1927)
◌̗, ◌̖	combining acute and grave below	lower-pitched rising / falling tone contour		for languages that distinguish multiple rising or falling tones

== See also ==
- History of the IPA
- Americanist phonetic notation
- Sinological phonetic notation
- Finno-Ugric transcription
- Phonetic Symbol Guide
- Click letter

Place →	Labial					Coronal										Dorsal					Laryngeal			
Manner ↓	Bilabial		Labiodental		Linguolabial		Dental		Alveolar		Postalveolar		Retroflex		(Alveolo-)palatal		Velar		Uvular		Pharyngeal/epiglottal		Glottal	
Nasal	m̥	m	ɱ̊	ɱ		n̼	n̪̊	n̪	n̥	n	n̠̊	n̠	ɳ̊	ɳ	ɲ̊	ɲ	ŋ̊	ŋ	ɴ̥	ɴ				
Plosive	p	b	p̪	b̪	t̼	d̼	t̪	d̪	t	d			ʈ	ɖ	c	ɟ	k	ɡ	q	ɢ	ʡ		ʔ	
Sibilant affricate							t̪s̪	d̪z̪	ts	dz	t̠ʃ	d̠ʒ	tʂ	dʐ	tɕ	dʑ								
Non-sibilant affricate	pɸ	bβ	p̪f	b̪v			t̪θ	d̪ð	tɹ̝̊	dɹ̝	t̠ɹ̠̊˔	d̠ɹ̠˔			cç	ɟʝ	kx	ɡɣ	qχ	ɢʁ	ʡʜ	ʡʢ	ʔh	
Sibilant fricative							s̪	z̪	s	z	ʃ	ʒ	ʂ	ʐ	ɕ	ʑ								
Non-sibilant fricative	ɸ	β	f	v	θ̼	ð̼	θ	ð	θ̠	ð̠	ɹ̠̊˔	ɹ̠˔	ɻ̊˔	ɻ˔	ç	ʝ	x	ɣ	χ	ʁ	ħ	ʕ	h	ɦ
Approximant		β̞		ʋ				ð̞		ɹ		ɹ̠		ɻ		j		ɰ						˷
Tap/flap		ⱱ̟		ⱱ					ɾ̥	ɾ			ɽ̊	ɽ						ɢ̆		ʡ̆		
Trill	ʙ̥	ʙ							r̥	r		r̠	ɽ̊r̥	ɽr					ʀ̥	ʀ	ʜ	ʢ		
Lateral affricate									tɬ	dɮ			tꞎ	d𝼅	c𝼆	ɟʎ̝	k𝼄	ɡʟ̝						
Lateral fricative							ɬ̪		ɬ	ɮ			ꞎ	𝼅	𝼆	ʎ̝	𝼄	ʟ̝						
Lateral approximant								l̪	l̥	l		l̠	ɭ̊	ɭ	ʎ̥	ʎ	ʟ̥	ʟ		ʟ̠				
Lateral tap/flap									ɺ̥	ɺ			𝼈̊	𝼈		ʎ̆		ʟ̆						

		BL	LD	D	A	PA	RF	P	V	U
Implosive	Voiced	ɓ			ɗ		ᶑ	ʄ	ɠ	ʛ
Implosive	Voiceless	ɓ̥			ɗ̥		ᶑ̊	ʄ̊	ɠ̊	ʛ̥
Ejective	Stop	pʼ			tʼ		ʈʼ	cʼ	kʼ	qʼ
Ejective	Affricate		p̪fʼ	tθʼ	tsʼ	tʃʼ	tʂʼ	tɕʼ	kxʼ	qχʼ
Ejective	Fricative	ɸʼ	fʼ	θʼ	sʼ	ʃʼ	ʂʼ	ɕʼ	xʼ	χʼ
Ejective	Lateral affricate				tɬʼ			c𝼆ʼ	k𝼄ʼ	q𝼄ʼ
Ejective	Lateral fricative				ɬʼ					
Click (top: velar; bottom: uvular)	Tenuis	kʘ qʘ		kǀ qǀ	kǃ qǃ		k𝼊 q𝼊	kǂ qǂ		
Click (top: velar; bottom: uvular)	Voiced	ɡʘ ɢʘ		ɡǀ ɢǀ	ɡǃ ɢǃ		ɡ𝼊 ɢ𝼊	ɡǂ ɢǂ		
Click (top: velar; bottom: uvular)	Nasal	ŋʘ ɴʘ		ŋǀ ɴǀ	ŋǃ ɴǃ		ŋ𝼊 ɴ𝼊	ŋǂ ɴǂ	ʞ	
Click (top: velar; bottom: uvular)	Tenuis lateral				kǁ qǁ					
Click (top: velar; bottom: uvular)	Voiced lateral				ɡǁ ɢǁ					
Click (top: velar; bottom: uvular)	Nasal lateral				ŋǁ ɴǁ					
