= Dania transcription =

Phonetic transcription

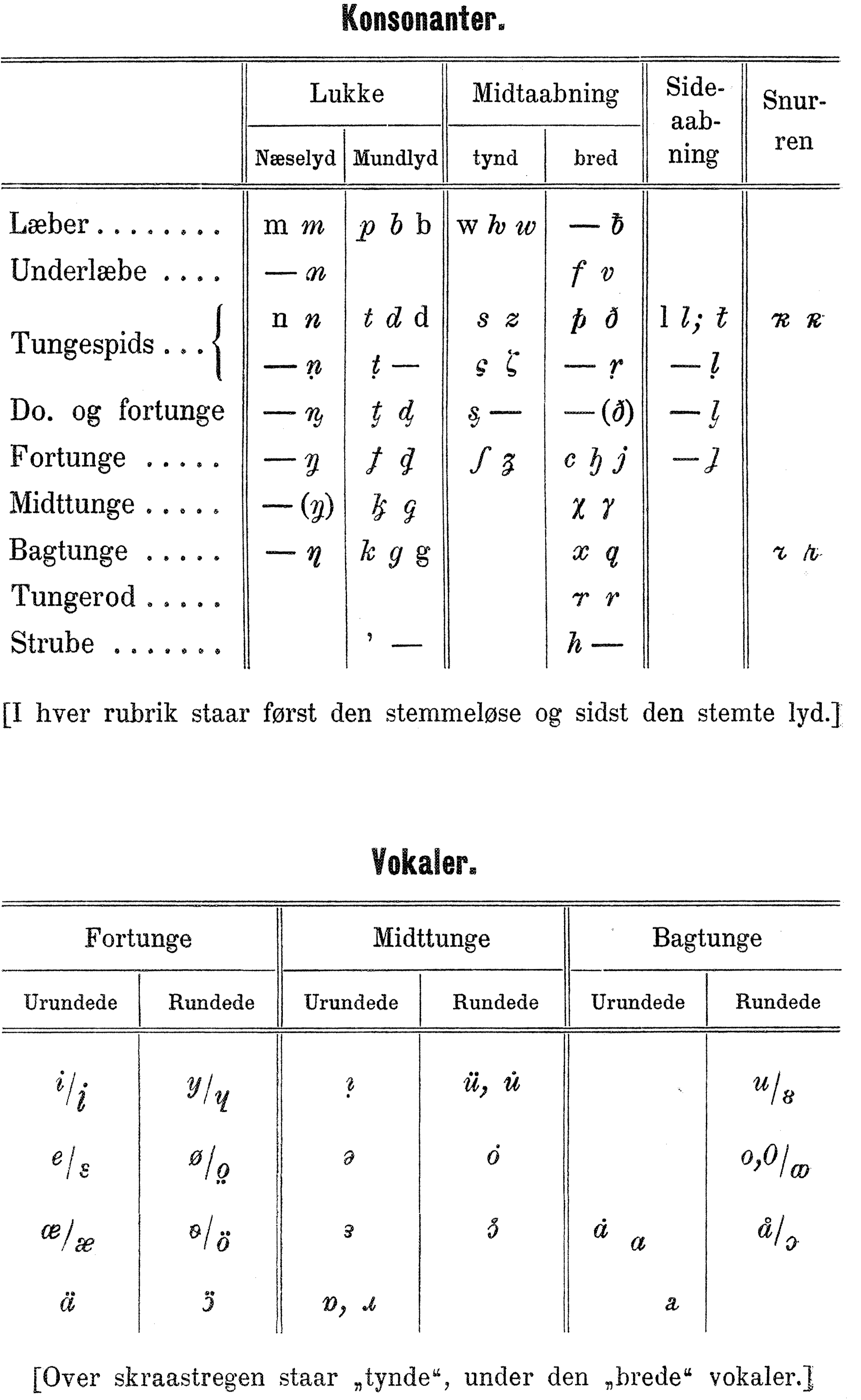
Table of consonant and vowel signs used in Dania, published by Jespersen in 1890

Dania (Latin for Denmark) is a transcription system commonly used in Denmark to describe the Danish language. It was invented by Danish linguist Otto Jespersen and published in 1890 in the magazine Dania, after which it was named.

Jespersen led an international conference in 1925 to establish an alternative to the International Phonetic Alphabet (IPA) that approached the IPA but retained several elements of Dania transcription.

== Consonant chart ==
Dania consonants
	Bilabial			Labio- dental			Dental			Alveolar			Palatalized			Post-alveolar			Palatal			Velar			Uvular			Glottal	
Nasal	m	hm	m			ʍ	n	hn	n			ṇ			ᶇ			ꬼ			ꬼ̣			ƞ					
Stop	p	b	b				t	d	d	ṭ	ḍ		ƫ (τ [tˢʰ])	ᶁ		ȶ^{1}	ȡ^{1}		ᶄ^{1}	ꬶ		k	g (gᷱ [kʷ])	g		(gᷱ)		ʼ	
Fricative/ approximant	w	ƕ	w				s		z	ς		ζ	ᶊ			ʃ		ʓ											
Fricative/ approximant			ƀ	f	v	v	þ	ð	ð	˜ṛ ^{2}		ṛ			δ	c	ꜧ	j	χ		γ	x	q	q (Note: The contrast between italic ⟨q⟩ and italic ⟨ɋ⟩ in the chart at the end of Kristensen (1924) appears to be a typo. In the index and in the description in the text the contrast is instead between roman ⟨q⟩ and italic ⟨q⟩.)	˜r ^{2}	hr	r	h	
Lateral							l	hl	l			ḷ			ᶅ			ȴ^{1}						(ł)					
Trill	pʳ						˜ʀ ^{2}		ʀ																ꭋ		𝓇	ɹ˷ ^{2}	ɹ [ɐ̯]

^{1} These letter shapes are approximations. In Jespersen's 1890 paper the loop goes the other way or (for what is shown in the table immediately above as ⟨ᶄ⟩) crosses back over the leg of the letter: ⟨⟩.

For mixed voicing, one normally writes (e.g. for voiced [m]) ⟨mh⟩ for final voicelessness and ⟨hm⟩ for initial voicelessness, with roman-type ⟨m⟩ for fully voiceless [m̥]. But there are two ligatures: ⟨hw⟩ > ⟨ƕ⟩ and ⟨hj⟩ > ⟨ꜧ⟩. Roman-type ⟨b⟩, ⟨d⟩ etc. are fully voiced sounds which occur in dialects such as Bornholmsk. Note that roman typeface indicates a modally voiced sound with plosives, a voiceless sound with sonorants and laterals, and a partially voiceless sound with fricatives/approximants.

== Vowel chart ==
A mid dot may be added for length. The comma for stød combines with this to form the 'comma-punkt'.

Dania vowels
	Front		Central		Back	
	unrounded	rounded	unrounded	rounded	unrounded	rounded
High	i [i]	y [y], ü [ʉ̟]^{1}	ᴉ [ɨ]	u̇ [ʉ]^{1}		u [u]
Near high	𝽱 [ɪ]	ɥ [ʏ]				ȣ [ʊ]
High-mid^{2}	e [e] (ė [e̞])	ø [ø] (ø̇ [ø̞])	ə [ɘ]	ȯ [ɵ]		o [o] (0 [o̞])
Mid	ɛ [ɛ̝]	o̤ [œ̝]				ꜵ [ɔ̝]
Low-mid	œ [ɛ]	ꝋ [œ]	ɜ [ɜ]	ɔ̇ [ɞ]	ɑ [ʌ]	ɑ̊ [ɔ]
Near-low	æ^{3} [ɛ̞]	ö [œ̞]	ɒ̤ [ɐ̟], ɒ [ɐ]			
Low	ɑ̈ [æ]	ɔ̈ [ɶ]	ɑ̇ [a]		a^{4} [ɑ]	ɔ [ɒ]

^{1} ⟨ü⟩ and ⟨u̇⟩ are the Swedish and Norwegian orthographic ⟨u⟩, respectively.
^{2} Mid ⟨ė⟩, ⟨ø̇⟩, ⟨0⟩ are for weak allophones of what are written ⟨e⟩, ⟨ø⟩, ⟨o⟩.
^{3} This is an italic ⟨æ⟩ (an italic ae ligature). It may look the same as italic ⟨œ⟩ (an italic oe ligature) in some fonts.
^{4} This is an italic ⟨a⟩ (intended as an italic or oblique form of "double-decker" lowercase ⟨A⟩). It may look the same as italic ⟨ɑ⟩ (an italic form of "single-decker" lowercase ⟨A⟩) in some fonts.

== 1925 Copenhagen Conference ==
A conference held in Copenhagen in 1925 under the auspices of the Union Académique Internationale (UAI) produced recommendations for an international phonetic alphabet that was a compromise between Dania transcription, the International Phonetic Alphabet (then still in flux), and other systems then in use. Members of the convention objected, for example, to the use of unrelated letters for palatal consonants in the IPA, opting instead for a characteristic curl to derive them, and they excluded the IPA letter ⟨c⟩ altogether. The system is as follows:

Phonetic transcription is demarcated by square brackets, [...], and transliteration or original orthography by parentheses overstruck with small circles, ⹢...⹣ (as in Palaeotype and the English Phonotypic Alphabet).

Long vowels are marked by a high dot, ⟨a·⟩, and half-long vowels by a low dot, ⟨a.⟩. Extra-long vowels are ⟨a··⟩.

Stress is ⟨ˈa⟩, ⟨ˌa⟩, ⟨ˈˈa⟩ or bold ⟨ˈa⟩ (before the syllable, not just the vowel) as in the IPA. It may be lexical or prosodic.

Tone is indicated by staveless marks before the syllable, e.g. ⟨ˉa⟩ level, ⟨´a⟩ rising, ⟨ˋa⟩ falling, ⟨ˆa⟩ rising-falling, ⟨ˇa⟩ falling-rising, ⟨˜a⟩ "waving". Additionally, ⟨´a⟩ and ⟨ˋa⟩ are used for the "simple" and "compound" tones of Norwegian and Swedish.

Syllabic is ⟨n̥⟩ and non-syllabic ⟨i̯⟩; ⟨n̬⟩ for 'voiceless' (the opposite meaning of this diacritic in IPA) and ⟨h̩⟩ for 'voiced'. A diacritic (not supported by Unicode) that resembles ⟨()⟩ joined at their tips is an alternative for 'voiced'.)

Nasal vowels are e.g. ⟨ą⟩.

Labialization is ⟨n̫⟩. The same diacritic turned 180°, ⟨u᫦⟩, is used for 'unrounded'.

Dental consonants are e.g. ⟨t̪⟩, retroflex either ⟨ʈ⟩ or ⟨ṭ⟩.

Palatal consonants are marked, as in Dania transcription, with the looped tail of a cursive ⟨j⟩. This is found on both alveolar ⟨t⟩ ⟨d⟩ ⟨ʦ⟩ ⟨s⟩ ⟨z⟩ ⟨n⟩ ⟨l⟩ and velar ⟨k⟩ ⟨g⟩ ⟨x⟩ (the last equivalent to IPA ⟨ç⟩). ⟨g⟩-loop loses its original tail, so that it looks like ⟨c⟩ with a looped ⟨j⟩ tail.

Palatalized consonants are either ⟨n̑⟩ or ⟨n ̑⟩. Finer shades may be indicated by ⟨tⁱ⟩, ⟨tᵉ⟩ etc.

⟨ʃ⟩ ⟨ʒ⟩ are retained for generic hushing fricatives, covering both ⟨ʂ⟩ ⟨ʐ⟩ and palatal ⟨s⟩-loop, ⟨z⟩-loop.

For fricatives, Greek ⟨ϕ⟩ ⟨β⟩ (bilabial), ⟨ϑ⟩ ⟨δ⟩ (dental) and ⟨χ⟩ ⟨γ⟩ (velar) are used. Cyrillic ⟨ф⟩ may be used for Greek ⟨ϕ⟩ to avoid confusion with the IPA vowel ⟨ø⟩. Greek ⟨δ⟩ should have a flat top, as it often does in handwriting. Roman ⟨x⟩ may be used for Greek ⟨χ⟩.

⟨ƕ⟩ is provided as an alternative to voiceless ⟨w̬⟩.

Dotless ⟨ȷ⟩ is used instead of IPA ⟨j⟩ to avoid confusion with the many conventional uses of roman ⟨j⟩ (for [j] in German, [t͡ɕ] in Pinyin, [d͡ʒ] in English, etc.).

For the velar nasal, a variant with the tail is raised to ⟨ꬻ⟩ (as in Teuthonista) was chosen to avoid clashing with diacritics placed under the letter.

Uvulars are small-cap roman ⟨ᴋ⟩ (or ⟨q⟩), ⟨ɢ⟩, ⟨ɴ⟩, ⟨ʟ⟩ (predating any IPA letter for this sound), ⟨ʀ⟩ and full-cap Greek ⟨Χ⟩ ⟨Γ⟩ for the fricatives.

Pharyngeals are ⟨ħ⟩ and ⟨ᵋ⟩ (the latter a Unicode approximation).

⟨ʼ⟩ is glottal stop, ⟨tʽ⟩ weak aspiration, ⟨th⟩ strong aspiration.

⟨r⟩ is a trill; ⟨ř⟩ is the sound written the same way in Czech. ⟨ꭋ⟩ is a dorsal (but not uvular) rhotic.

For clarity, ligatures may be used for affricates, as in the IPA of the time.

Unreleased plosives are marked with a raised square, e.g. ⟨t⸋⟩.

Clicks are indicated with a raised triangle over or after a letter (not supported by Unicode, but approximately ⟨t̄̂⟩ or ⟨tᐞ⟩).

Cyrillic ⟨ы⟩ was chosen for the high central unrounded vowel.

Vowels (1925)
	Front		Central		Back	
	unrounded	rounded	unrounded	rounded	unrounded	rounded
High	i	ü	ы	u̇		u
High-mid	e	ö	ə	ȯ		o
Low-mid	ɛ	ɔ̈	ᴈ	ɔ̇		ɔ
Low	a (ä)		(ȧ)		ɑ (a)	

⟨ä⟩ ⟨ȧ⟩ ⟨a⟩ may be used in place of ⟨a⟩ ⟨ɑ⟩ to avoid the confusion of the latter in italic typeface.

A closer vowel is ⟨ẹ⟩ (as in Lepsius) or ⟨e͔⟩; a more open vowel is ⟨e̠⟩ or ⟨e͕⟩.

== See also ==
- Finno-Ugric transcription (or Uralic Phonetic Alphabet)
- General Alphabet of Cameroon Languages
- Landsmålsalfabetet, for Swedish
- Norvegia, for Norwegian
- Palaeotype alphabet, for English
- Teuthonista, for German
