= Sonant =

Sonant may refer to:

- Sonorant, particularly in Indo-European studies
- Voiced consonant, opposed to surd
- Syllabic consonant
