= Alveolar R =

Alveolar R may refer to several types of alveolar consonant:

- Alveolar trill
- Alveolar approximant
- Alveolar tap or flap
- Pronunciation of English /r/
