= Sinological phonetic notation =

Notation used for Chinese phonetics

Chinese linguists use a number of additional phonetic symbols that are not part of the standard International Phonetic Alphabet. These symbols are commonly encountered in introductory textbooks of Chinese phonetics and in introductory descriptive works of any Chinese "dialects". Many Western linguists who work in the field of Chinese linguistics also use these symbols; for instance, Loggins (2022) writes "[to] introduce the general reader to what they may encounter should they consult one of such publications, I am using the IPA-castaways [ʅ] and [ɿ]".

== Letters ==
=== Vowels ===
The following vowel letters are used by those who want to specify more equally spaced symbols in the IPA vowel space. They derive from the Americanist proposal by Bloch & Trager. In addition, ⟨ɩ⟩ and ⟨ɷ⟩ may differ slightly from their old IPA usage.

Letter	IPA value			
Letter	Transcription	Articulation		
Letter	Transcription	Place		Rounding
ɩ	[ɪ̟], [i̞], or [e̝]	near-close	front	−
ɷ	[ʊ̠], [u̞], or [o̝]	near-close	back	+
ᴇ	[e̞] or [ɛ̝]	mid	front	−
o̧ (Note: Bloch & Trager use a small capital omega ⟨ꭥ⟩ instead of an o with cedilla ⟨o̧⟩ for the mid back rounded vowel.)	[o̞] or [ɔ̝]	mid	back	+
ω	[ɔ̞] or [ɒ̝]	near-open	back	+
ᴀ	[ɐ̞]	open	central	∅

=== Apical vowels ===
The following letters derive from Karlgren, from the 'long i' and 'long y' of the Swedish Dialect Alphabet, with a terminal added to resemble a turned iota ⟨℩⟩. While they are frequently called "apical vowels" (derived from their name in Chinese linguistic tradition), they are typically analyzed as syllabic rhotic approximants or (lenited) syllabic fricatives in manner, and may be apical, subapical, laminal, or apicolaminal (simultaneously apical and laminal) in place, depending on the language. Some authors have also described them to exhibit vowel coloring. Note that the labialized examples below are somewhat simplified transcriptions for demonstrative purposes.

Letter	IPA value			
Letter	Consonantal			Vowel coloring
Letter	Transcription	Articulation		Vowel coloring
ɿ	[ ɹ̪̍ ], [ɹ̟̍], or [z̞̍]	apical, apicolaminal, or laminal	dental, denti-alveolar, or alveolar	[ɯ] / [ᵚ]
ʮ	[ɹ̩ʷ] or [z̩ʷ]	apical, apicolaminal, or laminal	dental, denti-alveolar, or alveolar	[u] / [ᵘ]
ʅ	[ ɹ̠̍], [ɻ̍ ], or [ʐ̞̍ ]	apical or subapical	postalveolar or retroflex	[ɨ] / [ᶤ]
ʯ	[ɻ̍ʷ] or [ʐ̍ʷ]	apical or subapical	postalveolar or retroflex	[ʉ] / [ᶶ]

=== Alveolo-palatal consonants ===
The following consonant letters are featural derivatives of ⟨ɕ⟩ and ⟨ʑ⟩, though which in the Sinological literature often stand for palato-alveolar [ʃ] and [ʒ] rather than alveolo-palatal [ɕ] and [ʑ] of the IPA. Aside from the aforementioned consonants, the others listed below are always intended to be alveolo-palatal.

Letter	IPA value		
Letter	Transcription	Articulation	
Letter	Transcription	Manner	Voicing
ȡ	[ɟ̟] or [d̠ʲ]	plosive	+
ȶ	[c̟] or [t̠ʲ]	plosive	−
ȴ	[ʎ̟] or [l̠ʲ]	lateral	+
ȵ	[ɲ̟] or [n̠ʲ]	nasal	+
ʑ	[ʑ] or [ʒ]	sibilant fricative	+
ɕ	[ɕ] or [ʃ]	sibilant fricative	−

=== Superscripts ===
Unicode supports modifier (superscript) variants of the IPA symbols and composite ⟨o̧⟩. For the remainder of the symbols listed above, support for modifier variants was approved in 2025 for inclusion in Unicode 18.

== Tone diacritics ==
Sinologists tend to use superscript Chao tone numerals rather than the Chao tone letters of the IPA, even though the numerals conflict with their values in other parts of the world. The correspondence is 1 for low pitch and 5 for high; single digits indicating a level tone are frequently doubled to prevent confusion with tone numbers, though sometimes a single digit is used with a short vowel or in a checked syllable and a double digit with a long vowel or an open syllable.

Numeral		IPA value	
Checked	Open	Letter	Pitch
⁵	⁵⁵	[˥]	High
⁴	⁴⁴	[˦]	High-mid
³	³³	[˧]	Mid
²	²²	[˨]	Low-mid
¹	¹¹	[˩]	Low

== Universal Phonetic Symbol Set in China ==
The Universal Phonetic Symbol Set in China is a set of nationally recognized phonetic symbols based on the IPA. It consists of the following sets of symbols:

- the full set of IPA consonant, vowel and tone letters, as well as a substantial fraction of historical and ext-IPA;
- the Sinological letters listed above;
- the affricate ligatures ʦ ʣ, ʧ ʤ, 𝼜 𝼙, ʨ ʥ, ꭧ ꭦ, plus analogous ligatures for pɸ bβ, pf bv, tθ dð, cç ɟʝ, kx ɡɣ/gɣ, qχ ɢʁ, of which tθ dð are scheduled for Unicode 18;
- Americanist notation noted in the IPA handbook such as č and ƛ; Greek letters commonly substituted for IPA such as γ and η; ψ of UPA, and þ
- the IPA variants schwa with the hook of an r, gelded question mark, and baby gamma;
- an ʯ-ʅ ligature, which is scheduled for Unicode 19, and what looks like an ι-ɕ ligature;
- tone letters include both generic ◌˥ ◌˦ ◌˧ ◌˨ ◌˩ and tone-sandhi ◌꜒ ◌꜓ ◌꜔ ◌꜕ ◌꜖, and the various combinations they form; the neutral-tone letters ◌꜈ ◌꜉ ◌꜊ ◌꜋ ◌꜌ and sandhi ◌꜍ ◌꜎ ◌꜏ ◌꜐ ◌꜑, and the traditional marks for the yin tones ⟨꜀⟩ píng, ⟨꜂⟩ shǎng, ⟨꜄⟩ qù, ⟨꜆⟩ ruʔ, and for the corresponding yang tones ⟨꜁ ꜃ ꜅ ꜇⟩;
- the full set of IPA combining and spacing diacritics, including old IPA / Sinological ⟨ʻ⟩ for aspiration, as well as some historical and ext-IPA diacritics;
- the Sinological dot ⟨ꞏ⟩;
- the arrows ↑ ↓ ↗ ↘ ⤴ ⤵ ↕ and the inverse of ↕ [two arrows facing each other vertically];
- ≺ for inhalation and the null symbol ⟨∅⟩.

As of 2026, the non-coronal affricate ligatures, the ι-ɕ ligature, and the facing vertical arrows are not planned for Unicode.

== See also ==
- Obsolete and nonstandard symbols in the International Phonetic Alphabet
- Americanist phonetic notation

Place →	Labial					Coronal										Dorsal					Laryngeal			
Manner ↓	Bilabial		Labiodental		Linguolabial		Dental		Alveolar		Postalveolar		Retroflex		(Alveolo-)palatal		Velar		Uvular		Pharyngeal/epiglottal		Glottal	
Nasal	m̥	m	ɱ̊	ɱ		n̼	n̪̊	n̪	n̥	n	n̠̊	n̠	ɳ̊	ɳ	ɲ̊	ɲ	ŋ̊	ŋ	ɴ̥	ɴ				
Plosive	p	b	p̪	b̪	t̼	d̼	t̪	d̪	t	d			ʈ	ɖ	c	ɟ	k	ɡ	q	ɢ	ʡ		ʔ	
Sibilant affricate							t̪s̪	d̪z̪	ts	dz	t̠ʃ	d̠ʒ	tʂ	dʐ	tɕ	dʑ								
Non-sibilant affricate	pɸ	bβ	p̪f	b̪v			t̪θ	d̪ð	tɹ̝̊	dɹ̝	t̠ɹ̠̊˔	d̠ɹ̠˔			cç	ɟʝ	kx	ɡɣ	qχ	ɢʁ	ʡʜ	ʡʢ	ʔh	
Sibilant fricative							s̪	z̪	s	z	ʃ	ʒ	ʂ	ʐ	ɕ	ʑ								
Non-sibilant fricative	ɸ	β	f	v	θ̼	ð̼	θ	ð	θ̠	ð̠	ɹ̠̊˔	ɹ̠˔	ɻ̊˔	ɻ˔	ç	ʝ	x	ɣ	χ	ʁ	ħ	ʕ	h	ɦ
Approximant		β̞		ʋ				ð̞		ɹ		ɹ̠		ɻ		j		ɰ						˷
Tap/flap		ⱱ̟		ⱱ					ɾ̥	ɾ			ɽ̊	ɽ						ɢ̆		ʡ̆		
Trill	ʙ̥	ʙ							r̥	r		r̠	ɽ̊r̥	ɽr					ʀ̥	ʀ	ʜ	ʢ		
Lateral affricate									tɬ	dɮ			tꞎ	d𝼅	c𝼆	ɟʎ̝	k𝼄	ɡʟ̝						
Lateral fricative							ɬ̪		ɬ	ɮ			ꞎ	𝼅	𝼆	ʎ̝	𝼄	ʟ̝						
Lateral approximant								l̪	l̥	l		l̠	ɭ̊	ɭ	ʎ̥	ʎ	ʟ̥	ʟ		ʟ̠				
Lateral tap/flap									ɺ̥	ɺ			𝼈̊	𝼈		ʎ̆		ʟ̆						

		BL	LD	D	A	PA	RF	P	V	U
Implosive	Voiced	ɓ			ɗ		ᶑ	ʄ	ɠ	ʛ
Implosive	Voiceless	ɓ̥			ɗ̥		ᶑ̊	ʄ̊	ɠ̊	ʛ̥
Ejective	Stop	pʼ			tʼ		ʈʼ	cʼ	kʼ	qʼ
Ejective	Affricate		p̪fʼ	tθʼ	tsʼ	tʃʼ	tʂʼ	tɕʼ	kxʼ	qχʼ
Ejective	Fricative	ɸʼ	fʼ	θʼ	sʼ	ʃʼ	ʂʼ	ɕʼ	xʼ	χʼ
Ejective	Lateral affricate				tɬʼ			c𝼆ʼ	k𝼄ʼ	q𝼄ʼ
Ejective	Lateral fricative				ɬʼ					
Click (top: velar; bottom: uvular)	Tenuis	kʘ qʘ		kǀ qǀ	kǃ qǃ		k𝼊 q𝼊	kǂ qǂ		
Click (top: velar; bottom: uvular)	Voiced	ɡʘ ɢʘ		ɡǀ ɢǀ	ɡǃ ɢǃ		ɡ𝼊 ɢ𝼊	ɡǂ ɢǂ		
Click (top: velar; bottom: uvular)	Nasal	ŋʘ ɴʘ		ŋǀ ɴǀ	ŋǃ ɴǃ		ŋ𝼊 ɴ𝼊	ŋǂ ɴǂ	ʞ	
Click (top: velar; bottom: uvular)	Tenuis lateral				kǁ qǁ					
Click (top: velar; bottom: uvular)	Voiced lateral				ɡǁ ɢǁ					
Click (top: velar; bottom: uvular)	Nasal lateral				ŋǁ ɴǁ					
