= Voiced alveolar approximant =

Consonantal sound represented by ⟨ɹ⟩ in IPA

ɹ
- IPA number: 151

Audio sample
- source · help

Encoding
- Entity (decimal): &#633;
- Unicode (hex): U+0279
- X-SAMPA: r\
- Braille: ⠼ (braille pattern dots-3456)
Image

A voiced alveolar approximant is a type of consonantal sound used in some spoken languages. It is familiar to most English-speakers as the ⟨r⟩ sound in rose (though typically § postalveolar). The symbol in the International Phonetic Alphabet that represents it is ⟨ɹ⟩, a lowercase Latin letter ⟨r⟩ rotated 180 degrees.

== Features ==
Sagittal section of a voiced alveolar approximant

Features of a voiced alveolar approximant:

- Its manner of articulation is approximant, which means it is produced by narrowing the vocal tract at the place of articulation, but not enough to produce a turbulent airstream.
- Its place of articulation is alveolar, which means it is articulated with either the tip or the blade of the tongue at the alveolar ridge, termed respectively apical and laminal.
- Its phonation is voiced, which means the vocal cords vibrate during the articulation.
- It is an oral consonant, which means that air is not allowed to escape through the nose.
- It is a median consonant, which means it is produced by directing the airstream down the midline of the tongue, rather than to the sides.
- Its airstream mechanism is pulmonic, which means it is articulated by pushing air only with the intercostal muscles and abdominal muscles, as in most speech sounds.

== Occurrence ==
=== Alveolar ===
Language		Word	IPA	Meaning	Notes
Albanian	Standard	libër	[ˈlibəɹ]	'book'	Allophone of /ɾ/. See Albanian phonology
Armenian	Classical	սուրճ	[suɹtʃ]	'coffee'	
Assamese		ৰঙা (rônga)	[ɹɔŋa]	'red'	
Assyrian Neo-Aramaic	Alqosh dialect	ܪܒ	[ɹɑbɑ]	'many'	Corresponds to /ɾ/ in most other Assyrian dialects.
Assyrian Neo-Aramaic	Tyari dialect	ܪܒ	[ɹɑbɑ]	'many'	Corresponds to /ɾ/ in most other Assyrian dialects.
Bengali		মারমা	[maɹma]	'Marma'	Phonetic realisation of /r/, especially in some Eastern Dialects and sometimes in conjunct before consonants. Corresponds to [r ~ ɾ] in others. See Bengali phonology
Burmese		ပရိဘောဂ	[pəɹḭbɔ́ɡa̰]	'furniture'	Occurs only in loanwords, mostly from Pali or English.
Catalan	Some dialects	encara	[ə̃ŋˈkäɹə]	'still'	Allophone of /ɾ/ between vowels. See Catalan phonology.
Dutch	Central Netherlandic	Nederlanders	[ˈneɪ.dəɹˌlɑn.dəɹs]	'Dutchmen'	Allophone of /r/ in the syllable coda for some speakers. See Dutch phonology.
Dutch	Western Netherlandic	Nederlanders	[ˈneɪ.dəɹˌlɑn.dəɹs]	'Dutchmen'	Allophone of /r/ in the syllable coda for some speakers. See Dutch phonology.
Dutch	Leiden	rat	[ɹat]	'rat'	Corresponds to /r/ in other dialects.
German	Moselle Franconian (Siegerland and Westerwald dialects)	Rebe	[ˈɹeːbə]	'vine'	Most other dialects use a voiced uvular fricative [ʁ], a uvular trill [ʀ] or an alveolar trill [r]. See Standard German phonology.
German	Silesian	Rebe	[ˈɹeːbə]	'vine'	Most other dialects use a voiced uvular fricative [ʁ], a uvular trill [ʀ] or an alveolar trill [r]. See Standard German phonology.
German	Upper Lusatian	Rebe	[ˈɹeːbə]	'vine'	Most other dialects use a voiced uvular fricative [ʁ], a uvular trill [ʀ] or an alveolar trill [r]. See Standard German phonology.
Greek		μέρα/méra	[ˈmɛɹɐ]	'day'	Allophone of /ɾ/ in rapid or casual speech and between vowels. See Modern Greek phonology.
Persian		فارسی	[fɒːɹˈsiː]	'Persian'	Allophone of /ɾ/ before /t/, /d/, /s/, /z/, /ʃ/, /ʒ/, and /l/. See Persian phonology.
Portuguese	Multiple Brazilian dialects, mostly inland Centro-Sul	amor	[aˈmoɹˠ]	'love'	Allophone of /ɾ ~ ʁ/ in the syllable coda. Velarized, may also be retroflex, post-alveolar and/or a rhotic vowel. See Portuguese phonology.
Spanish	Andalusian	doscientos	[do̞(ɹ)ˈθje̞n̪t̪o̞s]	'two hundred'	Allophone of /s/ before [θ]. See Spanish phonology.
Spanish	Belizean	invierno	[imˈbjeɹno]	'winter'	Possible realization of /r/ in the syllable coda due to English influence.
Spanish	Caribbean Colombian	invierno	[imˈbjeɹno]	'winter'	Possible realization of /r/ in the syllable coda due to English influence.
Spanish	Puerto Rican	invierno	[imˈbjeɹno]	'winter'	Possible realization of /r/ in the syllable coda due to English influence.
Spanish	Costa Rican	chorro	[ˈt͡ʃɔɹo]	'spurt'	Allophone of /r/, and of /ɾ/ before /l/. See Costa Rican Spanish.
Swedish	Central (Stockholm area)	ett område	[ˈʔɔ̂mːɹʊɞ̯d̪ɛ̥]	'a domain'	Allophone of /r/, especially word-finally and post-vocalically. See Swedish phonology.
Tagalog		parang	[paɹaŋ]	'like-'	Allophone of the more usual and traditional flap or trill [ɾ ~ r] and is sometimes thus pronounced by some younger speakers due to exposure to mainstream English.
Turkish	Marmara Region	artık	[aɹtʰɯkʰ]	'excess, surplus'	Occurs as an allophone of [ɾ] in syllable coda, in free variation with post-alveolar [ɹ̠]. See Turkish phonology.
Vietnamese	Saigon	căng ra	[kaŋ ɹaː]	'to stretch'	In free variation with [ɾ], [r] and [ʐ]. See Vietnamese phonology.
Zapotec	Tilquiapan	rdɨ	[ɹd̪ɨ]	'pass'	Allophone of /ɾ/ before consonants.

==== Spirant ====
Voiced alveolar spirant approximant

z̞

ð̠˕

Some languages have a voiced (post)alveolar approximant that is acoustically distinct from a typical [ɹ], which has variously been described as being '[z]-like,' 'non-rhotic', or 'non-sulcalized'. Some authors have reported the distinction as one of active articulation, with the formerly mentioned sound being classified as laminal, while a typical [ɹ] is distinguished as apical; though other authors have reported sounds of this type as being explicitly apical. Somewhat less controversially, the distinction may also be made as a featural classing, between a 'rhotic approximant' and a 'spirant approximant' or 'frictionless continuant'. These two latter terms are now used synonymously, though both recall older terms with slightly different meanings; they now refer to all approximants that are both non-liquid (rhotic and lateral) and non-semivowel.

The International Phonetic Alphabet has no symbol to represent this sound, but possible transcriptions with diacritics include ⟨z̞⟩ (a lowered [z]) and ⟨ð̠˕⟩ (a lowered and retracted [ð]), both of which have been used in literature. Several symbols have been proposed to represent this sound, but none have become widely accepted. In Sinological circles, the symbol ⟨ɿ⟩ has also been used for this sound, where it has often been referred to as an 'apical vowel'.

Language		Word	IPA	Meaning	Notes
Danish	Standard	ved	[ve̝ð̠˕ˠ]	'at'	Laminal and velarized; allophone of /d/ in the syllable coda. For a minority of speakers, it may be a non-sibilant fricative instead. See Danish phonology.
Extreme Southern Italian	Sicilian	raro	[z̞aːɾo]	'rare'	Corresponds to /rr/ in standard Italian, as well as word-initial /r/. Can be alveolar [z̞] or postalveolar [ʒ̞], depending on the speaker, both of which may also be geminated. Described as 'non-sulcalized sonorants', articulated without contact, though may retain some degree of frication; may be closer to a non-sibilant fricative, depending on the speaker.
Extreme Southern Italian	Calabro	raro	[z̞aːɾo]	'rare'	Corresponds to /rr/ in standard Italian, as well as word-initial /r/. Can be alveolar [z̞] or postalveolar [ʒ̞], depending on the speaker, both of which may also be geminated. Described as 'non-sulcalized sonorants', articulated without contact, though may retain some degree of frication; may be closer to a non-sibilant fricative, depending on the speaker.
Extreme Southern Italian	Salentino	raro	[z̞aːɾo]	'rare'	Corresponds to /rr/ in standard Italian, as well as word-initial /r/. Can be alveolar [z̞] or postalveolar [ʒ̞], depending on the speaker, both of which may also be geminated. Described as 'non-sulcalized sonorants', articulated without contact, though may retain some degree of frication; may be closer to a non-sibilant fricative, depending on the speaker.
Icelandic		veggfóður	[ˈvɛk.fo̞ð̠˕ɵ̞r̥]	'a wallpaper'	Usually apical. In free variation with a weak fricative [ð̠]; variably removed from the front teeth, up to (nearly) spot on [ð̞]. See Icelandic phonology.
Miyakoan	Irabu	[z̞zä]		'father'	Realized as [z̞z] when word initial, geminate [z̞ː] when presyllabic, variable when medial, and plain [z̞] when word final. Phonemically transcribed as /ž/ or /žž/. Devoiced to [s̞] following a voiceless bilabial plosive /p/. See Miyakoan language § Phonology
Nuosu Yi		ꌩ / syr	[sz̞᫡ᵊ̙˧]	'wood, tree'	Apical and syllabic; the lax–tense phoneme pair /z z/ are described as "fricativized vowels", and are phonetically approximated (approximant-like), pronounced roughly between the range of [i ~ ɪ ~ ɨ]. Highly susceptible to assimilation of both place and manner, such as palatalization, retroflexion, rhotacization, and lateralization, depending on the surrounding sounds. See Nuosu language § Phonology

=== Postalveolar ===
Voiced postalveolar approximant

ɹ̠

Audio sample
- source · help

Sagittal section of a voiced postalveolar approximant

The most common sound represented by the letter r in English is the voiced postalveolar approximant, pronounced further back than a typical [ɹ] and transcribed more precisely in IPA as ⟨ɹ̠⟩, but ⟨ɹ⟩ is often used for convenience in its place. For further ease of typesetting, English phonemic transcriptions might use the symbol ⟨r⟩ even though this symbol represents the alveolar trill in phonetic transcription.

The voiced velar bunched approximant [ɹ̈], often called bunched or molar r, sounds remarkably similar to the postalveolar approximant, as does the voiced retroflex approximant [ɻ].

Language		Word	IPA	Meaning	Notes
English	Australian	red	[ˈɹ̠ʷed]	'red'	Often labialized. May also be a labialized retroflex approximant. For convenience it is often transcribed ⟨r⟩. See Australian English phonology, English phonology, Rhoticity in English and Pronunciation of English /r/.
English	Received Pronunciation	red	[ˈɹ̠ʷɛd]	'red'	Often labialized. May also be a labialized retroflex approximant. For convenience it is often transcribed ⟨r⟩. See Australian English phonology, English phonology, Rhoticity in English and Pronunciation of English /r/.
English	Most American dialects	red	[ˈɹ̠ʷɛd]	'red'	Often labialized. May also be a labialized retroflex approximant. For convenience it is often transcribed ⟨r⟩. See Australian English phonology, English phonology, Rhoticity in English and Pronunciation of English /r/.
English	Most American dialects	car	[ˈkʰɑɹ̠]	'car'	Not labialized.
Faroese		rørar	[ˈɹ̠øːɹ̠ɐɹ̠]	'a groin'	Ranges from post-alveolar to retroflex. More often realised as a fricative. See Faroese phonology.
Igbo		órìè	[óɹ̠ìjè]	'4th and last day of the week, West'	
Malay		راتوس / ratus	[ɹ̠ä.tɵs]	'hundred'	More commonly trill [r] or flap [ɾ]. See Malay phonology
Maltese	Some dialects	malajr	[mɐˈlɐjɹ̠]	'quickly'	Corresponds to [ɾ ~ r] in other dialects.
Shipibo		roro	[ˈd̠ɹ̠o̽ɾ̠o̽]	'to break into pieces'	Pre-stopped. Possible word-initial realization of /r/.

As an allophone of other rhotic sounds, [ɹ] occurs in Edo, Fula, Murrinh-patha, and Palauan.

== See also ==
- Index of phonetics articles

== Notes ==
Place →	Labial					Coronal										Dorsal					Laryngeal			
Manner ↓	Bilabial		Labiodental		Linguolabial		Dental		Alveolar		Postalveolar		Retroflex		(Alveolo-)palatal		Velar		Uvular		Pharyngeal/epiglottal		Glottal	
Nasal	m̥	m	ɱ̊	ɱ		n̼	n̪̊	n̪	n̥	n	n̠̊	n̠	ɳ̊	ɳ	ɲ̊	ɲ	ŋ̊	ŋ	ɴ̥	ɴ				
Plosive	p	b	p̪	b̪	t̼	d̼	t̪	d̪	t	d			ʈ	ɖ	c	ɟ	k	ɡ	q	ɢ	ʡ		ʔ	
Sibilant affricate							t̪s̪	d̪z̪	ts	dz	t̠ʃ	d̠ʒ	tʂ	dʐ	tɕ	dʑ								
Non-sibilant affricate	pɸ	bβ	p̪f	b̪v			t̪θ	d̪ð	tɹ̝̊	dɹ̝	t̠ɹ̠̊˔	d̠ɹ̠˔			cç	ɟʝ	kx	ɡɣ	qχ	ɢʁ	ʡʜ	ʡʢ	ʔh	
Sibilant fricative							s̪	z̪	s	z	ʃ	ʒ	ʂ	ʐ	ɕ	ʑ								
Non-sibilant fricative	ɸ	β	f	v	θ̼	ð̼	θ	ð	θ̠	ð̠	ɹ̠̊˔	ɹ̠˔	ɻ̊˔	ɻ˔	ç	ʝ	x	ɣ	χ	ʁ	ħ	ʕ	h	ɦ
Approximant		β̞		ʋ				ð̞		ɹ		ɹ̠		ɻ		j		ɰ						˷
Tap/flap		ⱱ̟		ⱱ					ɾ̥	ɾ			ɽ̊	ɽ						ɢ̆		ʡ̆		
Trill	ʙ̥	ʙ							r̥	r		r̠	ɽ̊r̥	ɽr					ʀ̥	ʀ	ʜ	ʢ		
Lateral affricate									tɬ	dɮ			tꞎ	d𝼅	c𝼆	ɟʎ̝	k𝼄	ɡʟ̝						
Lateral fricative							ɬ̪		ɬ	ɮ			ꞎ	𝼅	𝼆	ʎ̝	𝼄	ʟ̝						
Lateral approximant								l̪	l̥	l		l̠	ɭ̊	ɭ	ʎ̥	ʎ	ʟ̥	ʟ		ʟ̠				
Lateral tap/flap									ɺ̥	ɺ			𝼈̊	𝼈		ʎ̆		ʟ̆						

		BL	LD	D	A	PA	RF	P	V	U
Implosive	Voiced	ɓ			ɗ		ᶑ	ʄ	ɠ	ʛ
Implosive	Voiceless	ɓ̥			ɗ̥		ᶑ̊	ʄ̊	ɠ̊	ʛ̥
Ejective	Stop	pʼ			tʼ		ʈʼ	cʼ	kʼ	qʼ
Ejective	Affricate		p̪fʼ	tθʼ	tsʼ	tʃʼ	tʂʼ	tɕʼ	kxʼ	qχʼ
Ejective	Fricative	ɸʼ	fʼ	θʼ	sʼ	ʃʼ	ʂʼ	ɕʼ	xʼ	χʼ
Ejective	Lateral affricate				tɬʼ			c𝼆ʼ	k𝼄ʼ	q𝼄ʼ
Ejective	Lateral fricative				ɬʼ					
Click (top: velar; bottom: uvular)	Tenuis	kʘ qʘ		kǀ qǀ	kǃ qǃ		k𝼊 q𝼊	kǂ qǂ		
Click (top: velar; bottom: uvular)	Voiced	ɡʘ ɢʘ		ɡǀ ɢǀ	ɡǃ ɢǃ		ɡ𝼊 ɢ𝼊	ɡǂ ɢǂ		
Click (top: velar; bottom: uvular)	Nasal	ŋʘ ɴʘ		ŋǀ ɴǀ	ŋǃ ɴǃ		ŋ𝼊 ɴ𝼊	ŋǂ ɴǂ	ʞ	
Click (top: velar; bottom: uvular)	Tenuis lateral				kǁ qǁ					
Click (top: velar; bottom: uvular)	Voiced lateral				ɡǁ ɢǁ					
Click (top: velar; bottom: uvular)	Nasal lateral				ŋǁ ɴǁ					
