= Latin omega =

Letter of the Latin alphabet

- Ꞷ ꞷ

Usage
- Writing system: Latin script
- Type: Alphabetic
- Sound values: [ʊ]; [ɔ]; [ɔ̞]; [ʘ]
- In Unicode: U+A7B6, U+A7B7

History
- Development: Ω ω: Ꞷ ꞷ
- Descendants: ɷ

Other
- Writing direction: Left-to-Right

Latin omega, or simply omega, is an additional letter of the Latin alphabet, based on the lowercase shape of the Greek letter omega ⟨ω⟩.

== Usage ==
It was included as a Latin letter in the Mann and Dalby 1982 revision of the African Reference Alphabet for the Bilabial click [ʘ] and has been used as such in some publications in the Kulango languages in Côte d'Ivoire in the 1990s. In other Kulango publications the letters V with hook ⟨Ʋ⟩ or Latin upsilon ⟨Ʊ⟩ are found instead.

The Italian humanist Giovan Giꞷrgio Trissino proposed in 1524 a reform of Italian orthography that included Latin omega for the open ⟨o⟩ sound ([ɔ]). He later reassigned it to the closed ⟨o⟩ ([o]).

In Sinological phonetic notation, Latin Omega is used for a Near-open back rounded vowel [ɔ̞], and the closed variant ⟨ɷ⟩ is used for a Near-close back rounded vowel [ʊ̠]

A variation of Latin omega, with a loop ⟨𝽠⟩ has been used within the Initial Teaching Alphabet since the 1960s to represent [uː] (the vowel in boot) alongside standard Latin omega, which represents [ʊ] (the vowel in book).

== Encoding ==
Character information
Preview	Ꞷ		ꞷ		𝽠		꟝		ɷ		𝽓		𐞤	
Unicode name	LATIN CAPITAL LETTER OMEGA		LATIN SMALL LETTER OMEGA		LATIN SMALL LETTER OMEGA WITH LOOP		LATIN CAPITAL LETTER CLOSED OMEGA		LATIN SMALL LETTER CLOSED OMEGA		LATIN SMALL LETTER BARRED CLOSED OMEGA		MODIFIER LETTER SMALL CLOSED OMEGA	
Encodings	decimal	hex	dec	hex	dec	hex	dec	hex	dec	hex	dec	hex	dec	hex
Unicode	42934	U+A7B6	42935	U+A7B7	122720	U+1DF60	42973	U+A7DD	631	U+0277	122707	U+1DF53	67492	U+107A4
UTF-8	234 158 182	EA 9E B6	234 158 183	EA 9E B7	240 157 189 160	F0 9D BD A0	234 159 157	EA 9F 9D	201 183	C9 B7	240 157 189 147	F0 9D BD 93	240 144 158 164	F0 90 9E A4
UTF-16	42934	A7B6	42935	A7B7	55351 57184	D837 DF60	42973	A7DD	631	0277	55351 57171	D837 DF53	55297 57252	D801 DFA4
Numeric character reference	&#42934;	&#xA7B6;	&#42935;	&#xA7B7;	&#122720;	&#x1DF60;	&#42973;	&#xA7DD;	&#631;	&#x277;	&#122707;	&#x1DF53;	&#67492;	&#x107A4;

Character information
Preview	𝽴		𝽵		𝽶		𝽷	
Unicode name	LATIN CAPITAL LETTER CLOSED OMEGA WITH LONG STEM		LATIN SMALL LETTER CLOSED OMEGA WITH LONG STEM		LATIN CAPITAL LETTER TURNED CLOSED OMEGA		LATIN SMALL LETTER TURNED CLOSED OMEGA	
Encodings	decimal	hex	dec	hex	dec	hex	dec	hex
Unicode	122740	U+1DF74	122741	U+1DF75	122742	U+1DF76	122743	U+1DF77
UTF-8	240 157 189 180	F0 9D BD B4	240 157 189 181	F0 9D BD B5	240 157 189 182	F0 9D BD B6	240 157 189 183	F0 9D BD B7
UTF-16	55351 57204	D837 DF74	55351 57205	D837 DF75	55351 57206	D837 DF76	55351 57207	D837 DF77
Numeric character reference	&#122740;	&#x1DF74;	&#122741;	&#x1DF75;	&#122742;	&#x1DF76;	&#122743;	&#x1DF77;

== See also ==
- Ω ω : Greek letter Omega
- Ѡ ѡ : Cyrillic letter Omega
- 𐐗 𐐿 : Deseret letter Kay

== Bibliography ==
- Pascal Boyeldieu, Stefan Elders, Gudrun Miehe. 2008. Grammaire koulango (parler de Bouna, Côte d’Ivoire). Köln: Rüdiger Köppe. ISBN 978-3-89645-610-6
- Diocèse de Bondoukou Nassian. 1992. Syllabaire koulango : réservé aux élèves des cours bibliques en Koulango (Inspiré par les syllabaires de la Société Internationale de Linguistique, collection: « Je lis ma langue », Nouvelles Éditions Africaines / EDICEF). Nassian: Diocèse de Bondoukou.
- Michael Mann and David Dalby. 1987. A thesaurus of African languages: A classified and annotated inventory of the spoken languages of Africa with an appendix on their written representation. London: Hans Zell Publishers.
- Michael Everson, Denis Jacquerye, Chris Lilley. Proposal for the addition of ten Latin characters to the UCS. ISO/IEC JTC1/SC2/WG2, Document N4297, 2012-07-26.
- Henry Frieland Buckner. A Grammar of Maskωke, or Creek Language, Marion, Alabama, 1860.
