= Postalveolar consonant =

Consonants articulated with the tongue behind the alveolar ridge

Postalveolar (post-alveolar) consonants are consonants articulated with the tongue near or touching the back of the alveolar ridge. Articulation is farther back in the mouth than the alveolar consonants, which are at the ridge itself, but not as far back as the hard palate, the place of articulation for palatal consonants. Examples of postalveolar consonants are the English palato-alveolar consonants [ʃ] [tʃ] [ʒ] [dʒ], as in the words "ship", "'chill", "vision", and "jump", respectively.

There are many types of postalveolar sounds—especially among the sibilants. The three primary types are palato-alveolar (such as [ʃ ʒ], weakly palatalized; also alveopalatal (Note: The term alveopalatal or alveo-palatal was traditionally synonymous with palato-alveolar, but may also be synonymous with alveolo-palatal.)), alveolo-palatal (such as [ɕ ʑ], strongly palatalized), and retroflex (such as [ʂ ʐ], unpalatalized). The palato-alveolar and alveolo-palatal subtypes are commonly counted as "palatals" in phonology since they rarely contrast with true palatal consonants.

== Postalveolar sibilants ==
For most sounds involving the tongue, the place of articulation can be sufficiently identified just by specifying the point of contact on the upper part of the mouth (for example, velar consonants involve contact on the soft palate and dental consonants involve the teeth), along with any secondary articulation such as palatalization (raising of the tongue body) or labialization (lip rounding).

However, among sibilants, particularly postalveolar sibilants, there are slight differences in the shape of the tongue and the point of contact on the tongue itself, which correspond to large differences in the resulting sound. For example, the alveolar fricative [s] and the three postalveolar fricatives [ɕ ʃ ʂ] differ noticeably both in pitch and sharpness; the order [s ɕ ʃ ʂ] corresponds to progressively lower-pitched and duller (less "hissy" or piercing) sounds. ([s] is the highest-pitched and most piercing, which is the reason that hissing sounds like "Sssst!" or "Psssst!" are typically used to attract someone's attention). As a result, it is necessary to specify many additional subtypes.

=== Tongue shape ===
The main distinction is the shape of the tongue, which corresponds to differing degrees of palatalization (raising of the body of the tongue). From least to most palatalized, they are retroflex (such as [ʂ ʐ], unpalatalized); palato-alveolar (such as [ʃ ʒ], weakly palatalized); and alveolo-palatal (such as [ɕ ʑ], strongly palatalized). The increasing palatalization corresponds to progressively higher-pitched and sharper-sounding consonants.

Less technically, the retroflex consonant [ʂ] sounds somewhat like a mixture between the regular English [ʃ] of "ship" and the "h" at the beginning of "heard", especially when it is pronounced forcefully and with a strong American "r". The alveolo-palatal consonant [ɕ] sounds like a strongly palatalized version of [ʃ], somewhat like "nourish you".

The following table shows the three types of postalveolar sibilant fricatives defined in the IPA:

IPA transcription of postalveolar sibilants
Voiceless						Voiced					
IPA	Description	Example				IPA	Description	Example			
IPA	Description	Language	Orthography	IPA	Meaning	IPA	Description	Language	Orthography	IPA	Meaning
ʃ	Voiceless palato-alveolar sibilant	English	shin	[ʃɪn]	shin	ʒ	Voiced palato-alveolar sibilant	English	vision	[vɪʒən]	vision
ɕ	Voiceless alveolo-palatal sibilant	Mandarin	小 (xiǎo)	[ɕiɑu˨˩˦]	small	ʑ	Voiced alveolo-palatal sibilant	Polish	zioło	[ʑɔwɔ]	herb, (slang) weed
ʂ	voiceless retroflex sibilant	Mandarin	上海 (Shànghǎi)	[ʂɑ̂ŋ.xàɪ]	Shanghai	ʐ	voiced retroflex sibilant	Russian; Polish	жаба (žaba) żaba	[ʐabə] [ʐaba]	toad, frog

=== Active articulator ===
A second variable is whether the contact occurs with the very tip of the tongue (an apical articulation [ʃ̺]), with the surface just above the tip, the blade of the tongue (a laminal articulation [ʃ̻]), or with the underside of the tip (a subapical articulation). Apical and subapical articulations are always "tongue-up", with the tip of the tongue above the teeth, and laminal articulations are often "tongue-down", with the tip of the tongue behind the lower teeth.

The upward curvature of the tongue tip to make apical or subapical contact renders palatalization more difficult so domed (palato-alveolar) consonants are not attested with subapical articulation and fully palatalized (such as alveolo-palatal) sounds occur only with laminal articulation. The apical–laminal distinction among palato-alveolar sounds makes little (although presumably non-zero) perceptible difference; both articulations, in fact, occur among English-speakers.

As a result, the differing points of tongue contact (laminal, apical and subapical) are significant largely for retroflex sounds. Retroflex sounds can also occur outside of the postalveolar region, ranging from as far back as the hard palate to as far forward as the alveolar region behind the teeth. Subapical retroflex sounds are often palatal (and vice versa), which occur particularly in the Dravidian languages.

==== Tongue-down distinction ====
There is an additional distinction that can be made among tongue-down laminal sounds, depending on exactly where behind the lower teeth the tongue tip is placed. A bit behind the lower teeth is a hollow area (or pit) in the lower surface of the mouth. When the tongue tip rests in the hollowed area, there is an empty space below the tongue (a sublingual or postdental cavity), which results in a relatively more "hushing" sound. When the tip of the tongue rests against the lower teeth, there is no sublingual cavity, resulting in a more "hissing" sound. Generally, the tongue-down postalveolar consonants have the tongue tip on the hollowed area (with a sublingual cavity), whereas for the tongue-down alveolar consonants, the tongue tip rests against the teeth (no sublingual cavity), which accentuates the hissing vs. hushing distinction of these sounds.

However, the palato-alveolar sibilants in Northwest Caucasian languages such as the extinct Ubykh have the tongue tip resting directly against the lower teeth rather than in the hollowed area, resulting in the absence of a sublingual cavity. Ladefoged & Maddieson (1996) term this a "closed laminal postalveolar" articulation, which gives the sounds a quality that J. C. Catford describes as "hissing-hushing" sounds. Catford transcribes them as ⟨ŝ, ẑ⟩, but this is not IPA notation; the obsolete IPA letters ⟨ʆ, ʓ⟩ have occasionally been resurrected for these sounds, and the original 1900 IPA chart included the symbols ⟨ᵷ, ʒ⟩ for them (the 1904 English-version supplemental material referred to them as "Circassian dental hiss[es]").

A laminal "closed" articulation could theoretically be made with alveolo-palatal sibilants and a laminal "non-closed" articulation with alveolar sibilants, but no language appears to do so. In addition, no language seems to have a minimal contrast between two sounds based only on the "closed"–"non-closed" variation, with no concomitant articulatory distinctions (for all languages, including the Northwest Caucasian languages, if the language has two laminal sibilants, one of which is "closed" and the other is "non-closed", they will also differ in some other ways).

=== Examples ===
A few languages distinguish three different postalveolar sibilant tongue shapes (/ʂ, ʃ, ɕ/) such as the Sino-Tibetan Northern Qiang and Southern Qiang, which make such a distinction among affricates (but only a two-way distinction among fricatives) and the Northwest Caucasian languages Ubykh (now extinct) and Abkhaz. More common are languages such as Mandarin Chinese and Polish, which distinguish two postalveolar sibilants, typically /ʂ, ɕ/ since they are maximally distinct.

The attested possibilities, with exemplar languages, are as follows. IPA diacritics are simplified, and some articulations would require two diacritics to be fully specified, but only one is used to keep the results legible without the need for OpenType IPA fonts. Peter Ladefoged had resurrected an obsolete IPA symbol, the under dot, placed under the alveolars ⟨s, z⟩ to indicate apical postalveolar, which is normally included in the category of retroflex consonants. The notation ⟨s̠, ṣ⟩ is sometimes reversed, and either may also be called 'retroflex' and written ⟨ʂ⟩. The more typical IPA transcriptions would be ⟨ʂ̻⟩ for laminal retroflex and ⟨ʃ̺⟩ or ⟨ʂ̺⟩ for apical postalveolar (⟨ʂ⟩ without diacritics for subapical retroflex). Laminal closed postalveolar would approximately be ⟨ʃ̻͆⟩, with the bridge above diacritic used for dentolabials, as the tongue touches the lower teeth.

(para-)IPA	Place of articulation	Exemplifying languages
[ʂ̻ ʐ̻]	laminal flat postalveolar (laminal retroflex)	Polish sz, rz, cz, dż, Mandarin sh, zh, ch
[ʂ̺ ʐ̺]	apical postalveolar (apical retroflex)	Ubykh, Toda
[ʃ ʒ]	domed postalveolar (palato-alveolar)	English sh, zh (may be either laminal or apical)
[ʃ̻ ʒ̻]	laminal domed postalveolar	Toda
[ɕ ʑ]	laminal palatalized postalveolar (alveolo-palatal)	Mandarin q, j, x, Polish ć, ś, ź, dź, Ubykh
[ʆ ʓ]	laminal closed postalveolar	Ubykh
[ʂ ʐ]	subapical postalveolar or palatal (subapical retroflex)	Toda

== Postalveolar non-sibilants ==
Non-sibilant sounds can also be made in the postalveolar region; the number of acoustically distinct variations is then significantly reduced. The primary distinction for such sounds is between laminal palatalized and apical retroflex non-palatalized. (Subapical retroflex non-sibilants also occur but tend to be palatal, as for sibilants.)

=== Non-palatalized (retroflex) ===
Retroflex stops, nasals and laterals (like [ʈ ɳ ɭ]) occur in a number of languages across the world such as in South Asian languages such as Hindi and various East Asian languages such as Vietnamese. The sounds are fairly rare in European languages but occur, for example, in Swedish; they are then often considered to be allophones of sequences such as /rn/ or /rt/. Also, for some languages that distinguish "dental" vs. "alveolar" stops and nasals, they are actually articulated nearer to prealveolar and postalveolar, respectively.

The typical rhotic consonant (r-sound) in English is a postalveolar approximant [ɹ̠]). In some dialects of American English, this may either be a velar bunched approximant [ɹ̈] or a retroflex approximant [ɻ]. Retroflex rhotics of various sorts, especially approximants and flaps occur commonly in the world's languages. Some languages also have retroflex trills. Toda is particularly unusual in that it has six trills, including a palatalized/non-palatalized distinction and a three-way place distinction among dental, alveolar and retroflex trills.

=== Palatalized ===
Palatalized postalveolar non-sibilants are usually considered to be alveolo-palatal. Some non-sibilant sounds in some languages are said to be palato-alveolar rather than alveolo-palatal, but in practice, it is unclear if there is any consistent acoustic distinction between the two types of sounds.

In phonological descriptions, alveolo-palatal postalveolar non-sibilants are usually not distinguished as such but are considered to be variants of either palatal non-sibilants (such as [c ɲ ʎ] or of palatalized alveolar non-sibilants (such as [tʲ nʲ lʲ]). Even the two types are often not distinguished among nasals and laterals, as almost all languages have only one palatalized/palatal nasal or lateral in their phonemic inventories. For example, the sound described as a "palatal lateral" in various Romance languages and often indicated as /ʎ/ is most often alveolo-palatal [ḻʲ] (like in Catalan and Italian) and sometimes a palatalized alveolar [lʲ], such as in some northern Brazilian Portuguese dialects.

The IPA does not have specific symbols for alveolo-palatal non-sibilants, but they can be denoted using the advanced diacritic like ⟨c̟ ɲ̟ ʎ̟⟩. Sinologists often use special symbols for alveolo-palatal non-sibilants, ⟨ȶ ȵ ȴ⟩, created by analogy with the curls used to mark alveolo-palatal sibilants. However, the actual sounds indicated using these symbols are often palatal or palatalized alveolar rather than alveolo-palatal, like the variation for symbols like [ɲ ʎ]. The decision to use the special alveolo-palatal symbols in sinology is largely based on distributional similarities between the sounds in question and the alveolo-palatal sibilants, which are prominent in many East Asian languages.

=== Examples ===
Some languages distinguish palatalized (alveolo-palatal) and non-palatalized (retroflex) postalveolar nasals and/or laterals.

Some Australian languages distinguish four coronal nasals and laterals: laminal dental [n̪ l̪], apical alveolar [n l], laminal postalveolar (palatalized) [ṉʲ ḻʲ], and apical postalveolar (retroflex) [ɳ ɭ].

== Postalveolar clicks ==
There are two postalveolar click types that can occur, commonly described as "postalveolar" and "palatal", but they would be perhaps more accurately described as apical and laminal postalveolar, respectively:

IPA	Description	Example			
IPA	Description	Language	Orthography	IPA	Meaning
ǃ	Apical (post)alveolar click	Nama	!oas	[k͡ǃoas]	hollow
ǂ	Laminal postalveolar click	!Kung	ǂua	[k͡ǂwa]	to imitate

== See also ==
- Place of articulation
- Alveolo-palatal consonant
- Retroflex consonant
- List of phonetics topics

== Notes ==
Place →	Labial					Coronal										Dorsal					Laryngeal			
Manner ↓	Bilabial		Labiodental		Linguolabial		Dental		Alveolar		Postalveolar		Retroflex		(Alveolo-)palatal		Velar		Uvular		Pharyngeal/epiglottal		Glottal	
Nasal	m̥	m	ɱ̊	ɱ		n̼	n̪̊	n̪	n̥	n	n̠̊	n̠	ɳ̊	ɳ	ɲ̊	ɲ	ŋ̊	ŋ	ɴ̥	ɴ				
Plosive	p	b	p̪	b̪	t̼	d̼	t̪	d̪	t	d			ʈ	ɖ	c	ɟ	k	ɡ	q	ɢ	ʡ		ʔ	
Sibilant affricate							t̪s̪	d̪z̪	ts	dz	t̠ʃ	d̠ʒ	tʂ	dʐ	tɕ	dʑ								
Non-sibilant affricate	pɸ	bβ	p̪f	b̪v			t̪θ	d̪ð	tɹ̝̊	dɹ̝	t̠ɹ̠̊˔	d̠ɹ̠˔			cç	ɟʝ	kx	ɡɣ	qχ	ɢʁ	ʡʜ	ʡʢ	ʔh	
Sibilant fricative							s̪	z̪	s	z	ʃ	ʒ	ʂ	ʐ	ɕ	ʑ								
Non-sibilant fricative	ɸ	β	f	v	θ̼	ð̼	θ	ð	θ̠	ð̠	ɹ̠̊˔	ɹ̠˔	ɻ̊˔	ɻ˔	ç	ʝ	x	ɣ	χ	ʁ	ħ	ʕ	h	ɦ
Approximant		β̞		ʋ				ð̞		ɹ		ɹ̠		ɻ		j		ɰ						˷
Tap/flap		ⱱ̟		ⱱ					ɾ̥	ɾ			ɽ̊	ɽ						ɢ̆		ʡ̮		
Trill	ʙ̥	ʙ							r̥	r		r̠	ɽ̊r̥	ɽr					ʀ̥	ʀ	ʜ	ʢ		
Lateral affricate									tɬ	dɮ			tꞎ	d𝼅	c𝼆	ɟʎ̝	k𝼄	ɡʟ̝						
Lateral fricative							ɬ̪		ɬ	ɮ			ꞎ	𝼅	𝼆	ʎ̝	𝼄	ʟ̝						
Lateral approximant								l̪	l̥	l		l̠	ɭ̊	ɭ	ʎ̥	ʎ	ʟ̥	ʟ		ʟ̠				
Lateral tap/flap									ɺ̥	ɺ			𝼈̊	𝼈		ʎ̮		ʟ̆						

		BL	LD	D	A	PA	RF	P	V	U
Implosive	Voiced	ɓ			ɗ		ᶑ	ʄ	ɠ	ʛ
Implosive	Voiceless	ɓ̥			ɗ̥		ᶑ̊	ʄ̊	ɠ̊	ʛ̥
Ejective	Stop	pʼ			tʼ		ʈʼ	cʼ	kʼ	qʼ
Ejective	Affricate		p̪fʼ	t̪θʼ	tsʼ	t̠ʃʼ	tʂʼ	tɕʼ	kxʼ	qχʼ
Ejective	Fricative	ɸʼ	fʼ	θʼ	sʼ	ʃʼ	ʂʼ	ɕʼ	xʼ	χʼ
Ejective	Lateral affricate				tɬʼ			c𝼆ʼ	k𝼄ʼ	q𝼄ʼ
Ejective	Lateral fricative				ɬʼ					
Click (top: velar; bottom: uvular)	Tenuis	kʘ qʘ		kǀ qǀ	kǃ qǃ		k𝼊 q𝼊	kǂ qǂ		
Click (top: velar; bottom: uvular)	Voiced	ɡʘ ɢʘ		ɡǀ ɢǀ	ɡǃ ɢǃ		ɡ𝼊 ɢ𝼊	ɡǂ ɢǂ		
Click (top: velar; bottom: uvular)	Nasal	ŋʘ ɴʘ		ŋǀ ɴǀ	ŋǃ ɴǃ		ŋ𝼊 ɴ𝼊	ŋǂ ɴǂ	ʞ	
Click (top: velar; bottom: uvular)	Tenuis lateral				kǁ qǁ					
Click (top: velar; bottom: uvular)	Voiced lateral				ɡǁ ɢǁ					
Click (top: velar; bottom: uvular)	Nasal lateral				ŋǁ ɴǁ					
