= J. C. Catford =

Scottish linguist and phonetician (1917 - 2009)

John Cunnison "Ian" Catford (26 March 1917 – 6 October 2009) was a Scottish linguist and phonetician.

== Biography ==
Catford was born in Edinburgh, Scotland, on March 26, 1917. After his secondary and university studies, he studied phonetics. He taught English abroad (in Greece, in Palestine and in Egypt), including during World War II.

Catford met his wife, Lotte, while he was living in Jerusalem. Lotte was from Vienna and spoke German. However, she had moved to Palestine and while she was young she learned other languages, such as Hebrew, English and Arabic.

Catford founded the School of Applied Linguistics at the University of Edinburgh, as well as another department in the same university that undertook the mapping of different English dialects throughout Scotland.

In 1964, Catford's was hired as Professor of Linguistics at the University of Michigan. He acted as director of the English Language Institute and the Laboratory of Communicative Sciences (later renamed the Phonetics Laboratory). He also served two terms as the chair of the Department of Linguistics.

He formally retired in 1986 but continued his work as Professor Emeritus at the University of Michigan. Many of his original works are kept at the University of Michigan's Bentley Historical Library.

Catford had two children from his marriage with Lotte named Lorna and Julian. He died of complications from pneumonia on October 6, 2009 in Seattle, Washington.

== Works ==
- A Practical Introduction to Phonetics, 2nd. ed., Oxford University Press, 2001. ISBN 9780199246359
- Fundamental Problems in Phonetics, Edinburgh University Press/Indiana University Press, 1977
- Word-stress and sentence-stress: a practical and theoretical guide for teachers of Basic English, 1950
- A Linguistic Theory of Translation, 1965
- Practical Phonetic Exercises, "UCLA Working Papers in Phonetics", with Peter Ladefoged, 1968
- Ergativity in Caucasian Languages, 1974
