= Labial fricative =

Any of several consonant sounds involving the lips

A labial fricative is a fricative consonant, whose articulation involves the lips. Several kinds can be distinguished based on whether the articulation involves only the lips or either the teeth or the tongue:

- Bilabial fricatives (articulated with both lips):
  - Voiceless bilabial fricative [ɸ]
  - Voiced bilabial fricative [β]
- Labiodental fricatives (articulated with the lower lip touching against the upper teeth):
  - Voiceless labiodental fricative [f]
  - Voiced labiodental fricative [v]
- Linguolabial fricatives (articulated with the tip or blade of the tongue against the upper lip:
  - Voiceless linguolabial fricative [θ̼] or [ɸ̺]
  - Voiced linguolabial fricative [ð̼] or [β̺]
