= Syllabic consonant =

Consonant which either forms a syllable by itself or is the nucleus of a syllable

Syllabic

◌̩

◌̍
- IPA number: 431

Encoding
- Entity (decimal): &#809;&#781;
- Unicode (hex): U+0329 U+030D
Image

A syllabic consonant, or vocalic consonant, is a consonant that forms the nucleus of a syllable on its own, like the m, n and l in some pronunciations of the English words rhythm, sudden and awful, respectively. To represent it, the understroke diacritic in the International Phonetic Alphabet is used, ⟨U+0329 ◌̩ COMBINING VERTICAL LINE BELOW⟩. It may be instead represented by an overstroke, ⟨U+030D ◌̍ COMBINING VERTICAL LINE ABOVE⟩ if the symbol that it modifies has a descender, such as in [ŋ̍].

Syllabic consonants in most languages are sonorants, such as nasals and liquids. Very few have syllabic obstruents (i.e., stops, fricatives, and affricates) in normal words, but English has syllabic fricatives in paralinguistic words like shh! and zzz.

== Examples ==
=== Germanic languages ===
In many varieties of High and Low German, pronouncing syllabic consonants may be considered a shibboleth. In High German and Tweants (a Low Saxon dialect spoken in the Netherlands; more Low Saxon dialects have the syllabic consonant), all word-final syllables in infinite verbs and feminine plural nouns spelled -en are pronounced with syllabic consonants. The High German infinitive laufen ('to walk') is pronounced [ˈlaʊfn̩] or (in some accents) even [ˈlaʊfɱ̍] and its Tweants counterpart loopn is pronounced [ˈlɔːʔm̩]. Tweants scholars even debate whether or not this feature should be incorporated in spelling, resulting in two generally accepted spelling forms (either loopn or lopen).

Standard German spoken in Luxembourg often lacks syllabic sonorants under the influence of Luxembourgish, so that laufen is pronounced [ˈlaʊfən], rather than [ˈlaʊfn̩].

Many dialects of English may use syllabic consonants in words such as sudden [ˈsʌd.n̩], awful [ˈɔːfɫ̩] and rhythm [ˈɹɪðm̩], which English dictionaries' respelling systems usually treat as realizations of underlying sequences of schwa and a consonant (for example, /ˈsʌd.ən/) or as realization of a constant (for example, /ˈsʌd.n/).

In Danish, a syllabic consonant is the standard colloquial realization of combinations of the phoneme schwa /ə/ and a sonorant, generally referred to as schwa-assimilation, e.g. katten ('the cat') /ˈkatən/ = [ˈkʰætn̩], dame ('lady') /ˈdaːmə/ = [ˈtɛːm̩], cykel ('bike') /ˈsykəl/ = [ˈsykl̩], myre ('ant') /ˈmyːrə/ = [ˈmyːɐ], sove ('sleep') /ˈsɒːʋə/ = [ˈsɒːʊ], reje ('shrimp') /ˈraːjə/ = [ˈʁɑːɪ], or huset ('the house') /ˈhuːˀsəð/ = [ˈhuːˀsð̩ˠ].

In all four dialect groups of Norwegian, a syllabic alveolar nasal, /n/, may be heard. It is syllabic when following other alveolar consonants and occurs most often in the definite singular form of masculine nouns (see Norwegian grammar) where the schwa has elided, e.g. bilen ('the car') [biː.ln̩], where it was originally [biː.lən]. With some speakers, the schwa may be reinserted, especially for words already ending in /n/ where the syllabic /n/ may have been entirely elided afterward, e.g. mannen ('the man') can either be pronounced like [mɑ.nn̩], [mɑn] or [man.nən]. In addition to this, a syllabic /n/ always occurs in words like vatn ('water') [ʋa.tn̩] and botn ('bottom') [bɔ.tn̩]. This syllabification of alveolar nasals also appears in Norrland and Svealand dialects of Swedish. In all cases where the alveolar sound becomes retroflex, /n/ also becomes retroflex /ɳ/, e.g. barten ('the moustache') [ba.ʈɳ̍] (see Norwegian phonology#Consonants). In some Norwegian dialects, a syllabic alveolar lateral approximant /l/ may be heard in the same circumstances as syllabic /n/, e.g. puddel ('poodle') [pʉ.dl̩], though it is not as common as syllabic /n/. A syllabic /l/ may also be heard in Bergen, where a following syllabic /n/ has elided completely, e.g. solen ('the sun') [suː.l̩]. In dialects that have palatalisation of some alveolar consonants like Northern Norwegian and Trøndersk, the following syllabic /n/ is also palatalised, e.g. ballen ('the ball') [ba.ʎɲ̍].

==== Obstruents ====
All of the consonants syllabicated in words of Germanic languages are sonorants. However, obstruents are used syllabically in English onomatopoeia, such as sh! [ ʃ̩ː] (a command to be quiet), sss [s̩ː] (the hiss of a snake), zzz [z̩ː] (the sound of a bee buzzing or someone sleeping), and tsk tsk! [ǀ] (used to express disapproval or pity), though it is not certain how to define what a syllable is in such cases.

=== Sanskrit ===
Sanskrit ऋ ṛ [r̩], ऌ ḷ [l̩] are syllabic consonants, allophones of consonantal r and l. This continues the reconstructed situation of Proto-Indo-European, where both liquids and nasals had syllabic allophones, r̥, l̥, m̥, n̥ (the last two had become a). By the era of Middle Indo-Aryan languages, the remaining syllabic consonants randomly became either a, i, or u, eventually restricting ṛ and ḷ into tatsama words in modern languages.

=== Slavic languages ===
Many Slavic languages allow syllabic consonants. Some examples include:

- Czech and Slovak r [r] and l [l], as in the phrase Strč prst skrz krk 'stick your finger through the throat' (in both languages). Slovak also has long versions of these syllabic consonants, ŕ and ĺ, e.g.: kĺb [kɫ̩ːp] 'joint', vŕba [ˈvr̩ːba] 'willow', škvŕn [ʃkvr̩ːn] '(of) spots'. Czech also has m̩ and n̩, e.g.: sedm [sedm̩~sedn̩] 'seven'.
- Slovene [m̩], [n̩] and [l̩] in non-native words, e.g. Vltava.
- Serbo-Croatian r [r̩], as in trčati 'to run'; l [l̩], as in bicikl 'bicycle'; and n [n̩], as in njutn 'newton (unit)' (syllabic /l/ and /n/ occur in loanwords and dialectal words). A part of Torlak dialects of south-eastern Serbia uses syllabic l [l̩] in native vocabulary, corresponding to Proto-Slavic *lъ/lь/ъl/ьl which had shifted to u [u] in the standards. For example, vlk (standard vuk 'wolf') and slza (standard suza 'tear'). In Serbian dialects between the Kupa river and Velebit of pre-war Croatia, other consonants can also be phonetically syllabic. For example, t [t̪], such as in mostć (standard mostić 'small bridge'), and č [t͡ʃ], such as in klinčć (standard klinčić 'clove').
- Macedonian р [r], such as in прв [ˈpr̩f] 'first', срце [ˈsr̩t͡sɛ] 'heart', незадржлив [nɛˈzadr̩ʒlif] 'irrepressible', рбет [ˈr̩bɛt] 'spine', рѓа [ˈr̩ɟa] 'to rust', рчи [ˈr̩t͡ʃi] 'to snore', etc.

=== Sinitic languages ===
Several Sinitic languages, such as Cantonese, Hakka and Hokkien, feature both syllabic m ([m̩]) and ng ([ŋ̍]) that stand alone as their own words. In Cantonese and Hakka, the former is most often used in the word meaning 'not' (唔, [m̩̂]) while the latter can be seen in the word for 'five' (五, [ŋ̩̌]) and the surname Ng (吳, [ŋ̩̂] or 伍, [ŋ̩̌], depending on the tone), among others.

==== Syllabic fricatives ====
A number of languages have syllabic fricatives or fricative vowels (sometimes also called fricativized vowels). In several varieties of Chinese, certain high vowels following fricatives or affricates are pronounced as extensions of those sounds, with voicing added (if not already present) and a vowel pronounced while the tongue and teeth remain in the same position as for the preceding consonant, leading to the turbulence of a fricative carrying over into the vowel. In Mandarin Chinese, this happens for example with sī, zī, shī, and rī. Traditional grammars describe them as having a "buzzing" sound. A number of modern linguists describe them as true syllabic fricatives, although with weak frication and voicing. They are accordingly transcribed ⟨sź̩, tsź̩, ʂʐ̩́, and ʐʐ̩́⟩ respectively.

However, for many speakers, the friction carries over only into the beginning of the vowel. The tongue and teeth remain where they were, but the tongue contact is lessened a bit to allow for a high approximant vowel with no frication except at the beginning, during the transition. John Wells uses the detailed transcriptions ⟨sz̞ᵚ⟩ for si and ⟨ʂɻᶤ⟩ for shi (ignoring the tone), with the superscript indicating the "color" of the sound and a lowering diacritic on the z to indicate that the tongue contact is relaxed enough to prevent frication. Another researcher suggests ⟨s͡ɯ⟩ and ⟨ʂ͡ɨ⟩ for si and shi, respectively, to indicate that the frication of the consonant may extend onto the vowel. Some speakers have even more lax articulation, opening the teeth and noticeably lowering the tongue, so that sī shī rī are pronounced [sɯ́ ʂɯ́ ʐɯ́], with the same vowel [ɯ] in each case and no r-coloring.

The Nuosu language has two similar "buzzed" vowels that have been described as syllabic fricatives, [z̞/z̞᫡] and [v͡ʊ/v̙͡ɵ̙].

Sinologists and linguists working in the Chinese analytical tradition frequently use the term apical vowel (舌尖元音 shéjiān yuányīn) to describe the aforementioned sounds and others like them in various Sino-Tibetan languages. However, this is something of a misnomer, as the articulation may be apical, subapical, laminal, or apicolaminal, depending on the language. The Sinological phonetic symbols ⟨ɿ ʅ ʮ ʯ⟩ are commonly used to transcribe these vowels in place of ⟨z̩ ʐ̩ z̩ʷ ʐ̩ʷ⟩ or ⟨C͡ɯ C͡ɨ C͡u C͡ʉ⟩, respectively. The term apical vowel should also not necessarily be taken as synonymous with syllabic fricative, as labial fricatives (e.g. [β]), which are articulated without the tongue, may also be syllabic.

=== Other languages ===
Some Berber, Salishan, Wakashan and Chimakuan languages have syllabic obstruents in normal vocabulary. Nuxalk (Salishan) and Oowekyala (Wakashan) are noteworthy for having words, phrases and entire sentences composed of only obstruents, for example Nuxalk pʼxwlhtlhp /pʼχʷɬtɬp/ 'bunchberry plant'.

In Standard Yoruba, the consonants m and n may be syllabic and carry tone like vowels. However, they always stand alone as syllables and cannot stand as syllable nuclei.

In Baoulé, m or n may be syllabic. As a stand-alone word, it means 'I' (first person subject pronoun), as in N ti baule [n̩̄ tɪ̄ bāūlē] 'I speak Baoulé'. Its quality varies with the consonant following it, as in M bá aiman [m̩̄ bá āɪ̄mān] 'I will come tomorrow'.

The Hungarian word s [ʃ̩], a high-register variant of és 'and', is a syllabic consonant, although it usually cliticises: s ettem /ʃ̩ɛtːɛm/ [ʃɛtːɛm] 'and I had eaten'.

The Taa word m [m] means eat.
