= Passy (surname) =

Origin
- Region of origin: French

Other names
- Variant forms: Passie, Passey, Peacey, Pacey, Piosey

Passy is a surname of French locational origin, derived from the Gallo-Roman Praenomen Paccius. The surname migrated to England during the 12th Century. It has variants, including: Passie, Passey, Peacey, Pacey, and Piosey. It is uncommon as a personal name. People with the surname include:

- Passy family, a prominent French political family, descendants of Louis François Passy (see article)
- Adele Passy-Cornet (1838–1915), German operatic soprano
- Antoine François Passy (1792–1873), French politician, geologist, and botanist
- Frédéric Passy (1822–1912), French economist, author, politician, and pacifist; father of Paul
- Isaac Passy (1928–2010), Bulgarian Jewish philosopher, and aesthetician; father of Soloman
- Jacques Passy (born 1975), Mexican football manager and coach
- Hippolyte Passy (1793–1880), French cavalry officer, economist, and politician
- Paul Passy (1859–1940), French linguist; son of Frédéric
- Solomon Passy (born 1956), Bulgarian scientist, mathematician, and politician; son of Isaac

== See also ==
- Pacey
