= Passy family =

French political family

Passy
- Political family
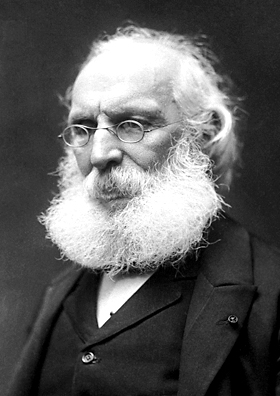
- Frédéric Passy, winner of the 1901 Nobel Peace Prize
- Country: France
- Origin: Eure
- Founder: Louis François Passy
- Estates: List: Château d'Anet (1823–1840); Désert de Retz (1856–1949); Eglise du couvent de Récollets

The Passy family is a French political family which had prominent members in 19th Century politics and 20th Century linguistics. Notable members of the family are all descended from Louis François Passy. He was born in Eure in northern France, and members of the family remained within the area for over a century.

The five sons of Louis François and Jacquette Pauline Hélène d’Aure held various positions within politics and the military, with two of them joining the Chamber of Deputies and one becoming Minister of Finance. They had one daughter, who married a factory owner from Gisors. The children of the Passy siblings carried on the political and military connection, becoming Deputies or marrying into influential aristocratic families. One member of the family, Frédéric Passy, was awarded the first Nobel Peace Prize, and others became notable phoneticians. Over the years, the family came into possession of three large houses, but they no longer remain within the family.

== Origins - Louis François Passy ==
Louis François Passy (29 February 1760 – 11 July 1834) was born in Étrépagny, in Eure. He worked as a stockbroker, then became Receiver General in Dyle in Brussels (then part of France).

In 1791, Louis François married Jacquette Pauline Hélène d’Aure (1772–1843). She was born into an aristocratic family: her brother was the Count d'Aure, a riding master under Louis XVIII. Louis François and Jacquette had five sons and one daughter.

== Antoine François line ==
Antoine François Passy (1792–1873) was the son of Louis François Passy and Jacquette Pauline Hélène d’Aure. He was elected Deputy in Eure from 1837 until 1848, and worked within the Ministry of the Interior while his brother Hippolyte was a minister.

He married Anne Henriette Péan de Saint-Gilles.

=== Louis Passy ===
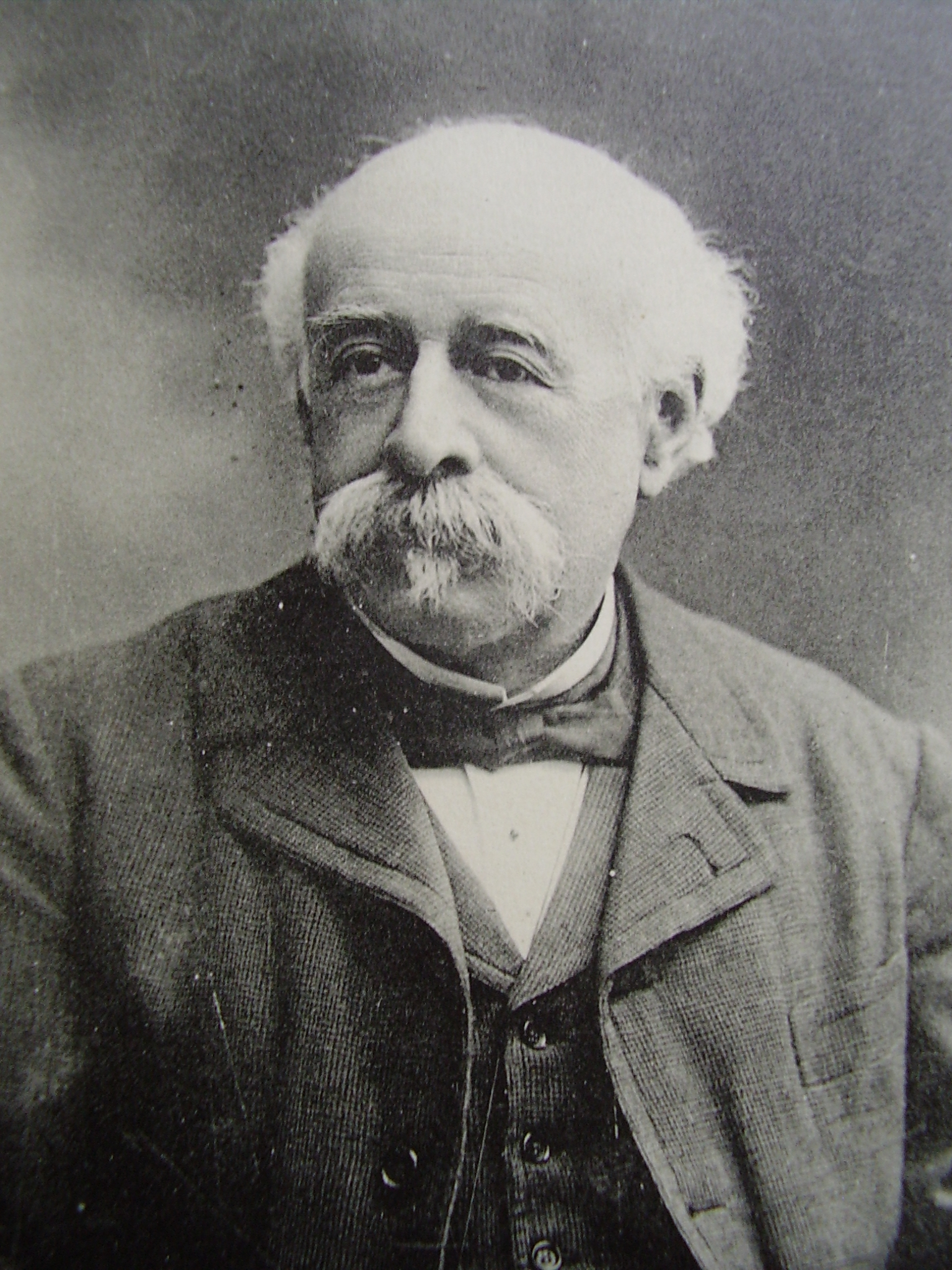
Louis Passy, historian and politician

Louis Charles Paulin Passy (1830–1913) was the son of Antoine François Passy and Anne Henriette Péan de Saint-Gilles. As a historian, he researched Normandy and focused specifically on the county of Vexin. He first ran for office as an Independent Liberal in 1863, and was elected Deputy of Eure from 1871 until 1913 as a Moderate Liberal. He was Undersecretary of Finance from 1874 until 1877. He was the secretary of the Société nationale d'Agriculture from 1884, and a member of the Académie des Sciences Morales et Politiques. At the time of his death in 1913, he was the oldest member of the Chamber.

He married Françoise Wolowska, the daughter of Louis Wolowski.

==== Marie Françoise Passy ====
Marie Françoise Louise Adelaïde Passy was the daughter of Louis Passy and Françoise Wolowska. She became Comtesse De Bueil on marriage, and had children.

== Hippolyte line ==
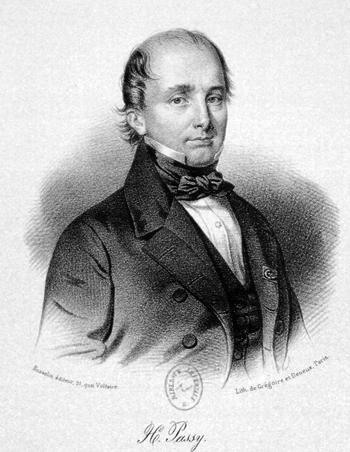
Hippolyte Passy

Hippolyte Philibert Passy (1793–1880) was the son of Louis François Passy and Jacquette Pauline Hélène d’Aure. After serving in Russia under Napoleon, he was elected Deputy for Louviers in Eure in 1830. He served as Minister of Finance multiple times over the next ten years. He retired from politics in 1851, following Napoleon III's coup d'état.

He married Claire Fourmont-Tournay, daughter of Gisors's mayor, Eustache Fourmont-Tournay.

=== Edgar Passy ===
Edgar Passy was the son of Hippolyte Passy and Claire Fourmont-Tournay. He was involved in the Ministry of Foreign Affairs as an embassy secretary. He was also a member of the Société de l'histoire de France, nominated by Jules Desnoyers and his uncle Antoine François.

== Justin Félix line ==
Justin Félix Passy (1797–1872) was the son of Louis François Passy and Jacquette Pauline Hélène d’Aure. He joined the military and fought at the Battle of Waterloo. In 1832, he was named conseiller-référendaire de seconde classe (Second class referendum advisor), replacing Bergeron d'Anguy. In 1856, he was promoted to the rank of officer in the Legion of Honour.

In 1821, he married Marie Louise Pauline Salleron. Her family made their money through tanning, and Félix joined his father-in-law's business after moving into the family home.

Marie Louise Pauline Salleron died in 1827, and Félix married Irma Moricet (his son's mother-in-law) in 1847.

=== Marie-Hélène Passy ===
Marie-Hélène Passy was the daughter of Justin Félix Passy. In 1871, she married Auguste Humbert Louis Berlion, Viscount de la Tour du Pin Chambly de La Charce.

=== Agathe Passy ===
Agathe Passy (died 1843) was the daughter of Justin Félix Passy and Marie Louise Pauline Salleron.

=== Frédéric Passy ===
Frédéric Passy (20 May 1822 – 12 June 1912) was the only son of Justin Félix Passy and Marie Louise Pauline Salleron. He originally trained in law, but soon became interested in economics instead. In the 1840s he worked as an accountant, then joined the European peace movement. Frédéric was a founding member of several peace societies, and in 1901 was awarded half of the first Nobel Peace Prize for his efforts. Alongside his peace work, he was Deputy for the 8th arrondissement of Paris, and was a member of the Legion of Honour.

He married Marie Blanche Sageret in 1847, and died in 1912 after a long period of illness.

==== Paul Passy ====
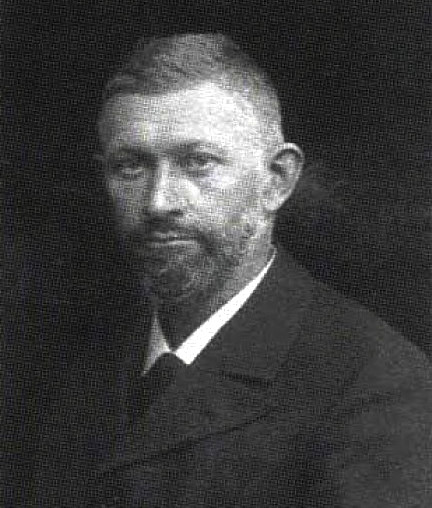
Paul Passy

Paul Édouard Passy (1859–1940) was the son of Frédéric Passy and Blanche Sageret. He began teaching English and German at the age of nineteen, and gained a doctorate in phonetics. Throughout his career he worked with and taught several influential phoneticians, and helped develop the International Phonetic Alphabet. He was a founding member of the International Phonetic Association with his brother, succeeding him as secretary. After retiring from academia, he set out to follow a Christian Socialist lifestyle, living primitively until his death in 1940.

==== Jean Passy ====
Jean Passy (1866–1898) was the son of Frédéric Passy and Blanche Sageret. Much like his brother Paul, he was an influential phonetician. He was responsible for developing ear-training techniques through the dictation of meaningless sound sequences in 1894. His work on these "nonsense words" was acknowledged by Daniel Jones, who had further developed the technique, in 1941. He was secretary of the International Phonetic Association, but was replaced by his brother due to life-threatening tuberculosis.

==== Marie Louise Passy ====
Marie Louise Passy was the daughter of Frédéric Passy and Blanche Sageret. She married Louis André Paulian, the head of the Chamber of Deputies's stenographic bureau. Their daughter, Mathilde Paulian, climbed over the railings of the Eiffel Tower observation deck in February 1912 and fell to her death.

==== Alix Passy ====
Alix Passy was the daughter of Frédéric Passy and Blanche Sageret. She married Charles Mortet, an officer in the Legion of Honour.

== Clémentine Passy line ==
Adélaïde Alexandrine Clémentine Passy (1801–1849) was the only daughter of Louis François Passy and Jacquette Pauline Hélène d’Aure. In December 1818, she married Auguste Davillier, a factory owner in Gisors. He died in 1833.

In 1836, she married Paul Adolphe Mettol-Dibon.

== Paulin Passy line ==
Paulin Passy was the son of Louis François Passy and Jacquette Pauline Hélène d’Aure. He was a cavalry captain in the French military.

== Hector Ferdinand Passy line ==
Hector Ferdinand Passy (died 1858) was the youngest son of Louis François Passy and Jacquette Pauline Hélène d’Aure. He married Clémentine Félicité Rossey, and was commander of Gisors's National Guard branch. He died in 1858.

== Other members ==
A member of the family, Pierre Passy, is known to have lived at the Désert de Retz estate in the 1910s and 1920s. His second daughter, Suzanne Constance Blanche Passy, married Inner Temple barrister Miles Edward Hansell in September 1911.

== Estates ==
=== Château d'Anet ===
In 1823, Louis François bought the Château d'Anet from Louis Philippe I. However, he never lived in the house. The house passed to his daughter and her second husband when he died, and they sold it in 1840.

=== Eglise du couvent de Récollets ===
The Passy family first came into possession of the Eglise du couvent de Récollets in Gisors through Louis François, who obtainined it from the government. The family held it for almost 200 years, passing to Antoine François and his son Louis. It then passed to his daughter, Marie, and her descendants.

=== Désert de Retz ===
In 1856, Frédéric Passy acquired the Désert de Retz estate in Chambourcy from Jean-François Bayard. Pierre Passy lived there, and the family owned the house until 1949.

== Family tree ==
Passy family tree

Louis François Passy	Jacquette Pauline Hélène d’Aure
Justin Félix Passy	Marie Louise Pauline Salleron	Hippolyte Passy	Claire Fourmont-Tournay	Antoine François Passy	Anne Henriette Péan de Saint-Gilles	Adélaïde Alexandrine Clémentine Passy	Paulin Passy	Hector Ferdinand Passy
Marie-Hélène Passy	Agathe Passy	Frédéric Passy	Marie Blanche Sageret	Edgar Passy	Louis Passy	Françoise Wolowska
Paul Passy	Jean Passy	Marie Louise Passy	Alix Passy	Marie Françoise Passy	Pierre Passy
Suzanne Constance Blanche Passy
