= John Esling =

Canadian linguist

John Esling FRSC
- Born: John Henry Esling; 5 June 1949 (age 76)
- Occupation: Linguist
- Notable work: Handbook of the International Phonetic Association; Voice Quality Symbols
- Title: Professor Emeritus of Linguistics at the University of Victoria; President of the International Phonetic Association (2011–15)

John Henry Esling, FRSC (born 5 June 1949) is a Canadian linguist specializing in phonetics. He is a Professor Emeritus of Linguistics at the University of Victoria, where he taught from 1981 to 2014. Esling was president of the International Phonetic Association from 2011 to 2015 and a co-editor of the 1999 Handbook of the International Phonetic Association.

His research primarily concerns the categorization, measurement and transcription of voice quality and vocal register, and the production and perception of laryngeal sounds.

== Biography ==
Esling received a BA in History and Languages from Northwestern University in 1971, an MA in Linguistics and Applied Linguistics from the University of Michigan in 1972, and a PhD in Phonetics from the University of Edinburgh in 1978. His teachers at Michigan included J. C. Catford and Kenneth Pike, and at Edinburgh David Abercrombie and John Laver.

After teaching at the University of Leeds, Esling began working at the University of Victoria in 1981. He chaired its Linguistic Department between 2008 and 2013. He retired in 2014 with the title of a Professor Emeritus of Linguistics.

Esling was president of the International Phonetic Association from 2011 to 2015. He served as its Secretary from 1995 to 2003, and edited the Journal of the International Phonetic Association from 2003 to 2011. He co-edited the 1999 Handbook of the International Phonetic Association with Francis Nolan, and the 2011 18th edition of the Cambridge English Pronouncing Dictionary with Peter Roach and Jane Setter.

In 2009, he was elected a Fellow of the Royal Society of Canada.

== Selected publications ==
- Esling, John H. (1978). Voice Quality in Edinburgh: A Sociolinguistic and Phonetic Study (Thesis). University of Edinburgh.
- Esling, John H.; Wong, Rita F. (1983). "Voice Quality Settings and the Teaching of Pronunciation". TESOL Quarterly. 17 (1): 89–95. JSTOR 3586426.
- Esling, John; Gaylord, Harry (1993). "Computer Codes for Phonetic Symbols". Journal of the International Phonetic Association. 23 (2): 83–97. doi:10.1017/S0025100300004898.
- Ball, Martin J.; Esling, John; Dickson, Craig (1995). "The VoQS System for the Transcription of Voice Quality". Journal of the International Phonetic Association. 25 (2): 71–80. doi:10.1017/S0025100300005181.
- Esling, John H. (1996). "Pharyngeal consonants and the aryepiglottic sphincter". Journal of the International Phonetic Association. 26 (2): 65–88. doi:10.1017/S0025100300006125.
- Esling, John H. (1998). "Everyone Has an Accent Except Me". In Bauer, Laurie; Trudgill, Peter (eds.). Language Myths. Penguin Books. pp. 169–175. ISBN 0-14026023-4.
- Esling, John H. (1999). "The IPA Categories 'Pharyngeal' and 'Epiglottal': Laryngoscopic Observations of Pharyngeal Articulations and Larynx Height". Language and Speech. 42 (4): 349–372. doi:10.1177/00238309990420040101.
- International Phonetic Association (1999). Nolan, Francis; Esling, John H. (eds.). Handbook of the International Phonetic Association: A Guide to the Use of the International Phonetic Alphabet. Cambridge University Press. ISBN 978-0-521-65236-0.
- Esling, John H. (2005). "There Are No Back Vowels: The Larygeal Articulator Model". Canadian Journal of Linguistics. 50 (1–4): 13–44. doi:10.1017/S0008413100003650.
- Esling, John H.; Harris, Jimmy G. (2005). "States of the Glottis: An Articulatory Phonetic Model Based on Laryngoscopic Observations". In Hardcastle, W. J.; Mackenzie Beck, J. (eds.). A Figure of Speech: A Festschrift for John Laver. Lawrence Erlbaum Associates. pp. 347–383. ISBN 0-80584528-3.
- Esling, John H. (2010). "Phonetic Notation". In Hardcastle, William J.; Laver, John; Gibbon, Fiona E. (eds.). The Handbook of Phonetic Sciences (2nd ed.). Wiley-Blackwell. pp. 678–702. doi:10.1002/9781444317251.ch18. ISBN 978-1-4051-4590-9.
- Esling, John H. (2011). "IPA". Oxford Bibliographies. Oxford University Press. doi:10.1093/OBO/9780199772810-0022.
- Jones, Daniel (2011). Roach, Peter; Setter, Jane; Esling, John (eds.). Cambridge English Pronouncing Dictionary (18th ed.). Cambridge University Press. ISBN 978-052-115255-6.
- Esling, John H. (2012). "Voice Quality". In Chapelle, Carol A. (ed.). The Encyclopedia of Applied Linguistics. Wiley-Blackwell. doi:10.1002/9781405198431.wbeal1271.
- Esling, John H. (2013). "Voice and Phonation". In Jones, Mark J.; Knight, Rachael-Anne (eds.). The Bloomsbury Companion to Phonetics. Bloomsbury. pp. 110–125. ISBN 978-1-4411-4606-9.
- Esling, John H.; Moisik, Scott R.; Benner, Allison; Crevier-Buchman, Lise (2019). Voice Quality: The Laryngeal Articulator Model. Cambridge University Press. ISBN 978-1-108-49842-5.
