= Hippolyte Passy =

French cavalry officer, economist and politician

Hippolyte Philibert Passy
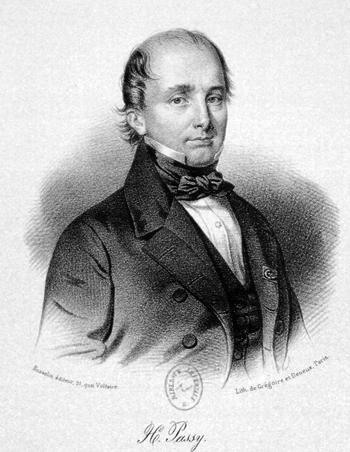

Deputy of Louviers
- In office 1830–1851

Minister of Finance
- In office 10 November 1834 – 18 November 1834

Minister of Finance
- In office 2 August 1836 – 6 September 1836

Minister of Finance
- In office 12 May 1839 – 29 February 1840

Minister of Commerce
- In office 22 February 1836 – 5 September 1836

Personal details
- Born: 15 October 1793
- Died: 1 June 1880 (aged 86)
- Spouse: Claire Fourmont-Tournay
- Children: Edgar Passy
- Parents: Louis François Passy (father); Jaquette Pauline Hélène d’Aure (mother)
- Relatives: See: Passy family; Antoine Cartier d'Aure (uncle)
- Profession: Economist

Hippolyte Philibert Passy (15 October 1793 – 1 June 1880) was a French cavalry officer, economist and politician.

== Early life ==
Passy was born into an aristocratic Catholic family. His father, Louis François Passy, was recevuer general des finances (Receiver General of Finance), an important office in the Ancien Régime. His mother was Jaquette Pauline Hélène d’Aure. Her brother, the Count d'Aure, was a riding master who fought for France in Egypt and Saint-Domingue.

One of his brothers, Justin Félix, was a soldier and the father of Nobel Peace Prize winner Frédéric Passy. Another brother, Antoine François, was a botanist and geologist.

== Military career ==
In 1809, Passy joined the Saumur Cavalry School. He joined the French military in 1812, and took part in Napoleon's Russian campaign. After leaving the military, Passy was a journalist until 1830.

== Political career ==
In October 1830, he was elected Deputy for Louviers. After joining the Moderate Liberals, he served as reporter on the 1831 and 1835 Budgets.

Passy held various ministerial positions in the July Monarchy and the French Second Republic. He served as Minister of Finance on several occasions:

- 10 November 1834 – 18 November 1834
- 2 August 1836 – 6 September 1836 (acting)
- 12 May 1839 – 29 February 1840

From 1835 to 1839, he was Vice-President of the Chamber. During this time, he also served as Minister of Commerce from 22 February 1836 until 5 September 1836. From 16 April 1839 until 12 May 1839, he was President of the Chamber of Deputies.

In 1843, Passy joined the Chamber of Peers. He became Minister of Finance again during the 1849 Presidency of Napoleon III, and retired from politics after the 1851 coup d'état.

In 1878, he was president of the International Congress on Provident Societies, a group dedicated to discussing economics and finance.

== Personal life ==
Passy married Claire Fourmont-Tournay, the daughter of Gisors's mayor, Eustache Fourmont-Tournay. They had a son, Edgar, who worked in the Ministry of Foreign Affairs as an embassy secretary. He was a member of the Société de l'histoire de France, nominated by Jules Desnoyers and his uncle Antoine.

Both Passy and his brother Antoine were lifelong friends of Hortense Allart, the Italian-French writer. They met while visiting Regnaud de Saint-Jean d'Angély's widow near Paris. The brothers were helpful in helping Allart's husband become a local government architect.

== Selected works ==
- Des causes de l'inégalité des richesses. Paris: Pagnerre. 1848.
- Des formes de gouvernement et des lois qui les régissent. Paris: Librairie Guillaumin et cie. 1876.
