= Journal of the International Phonetic Association =

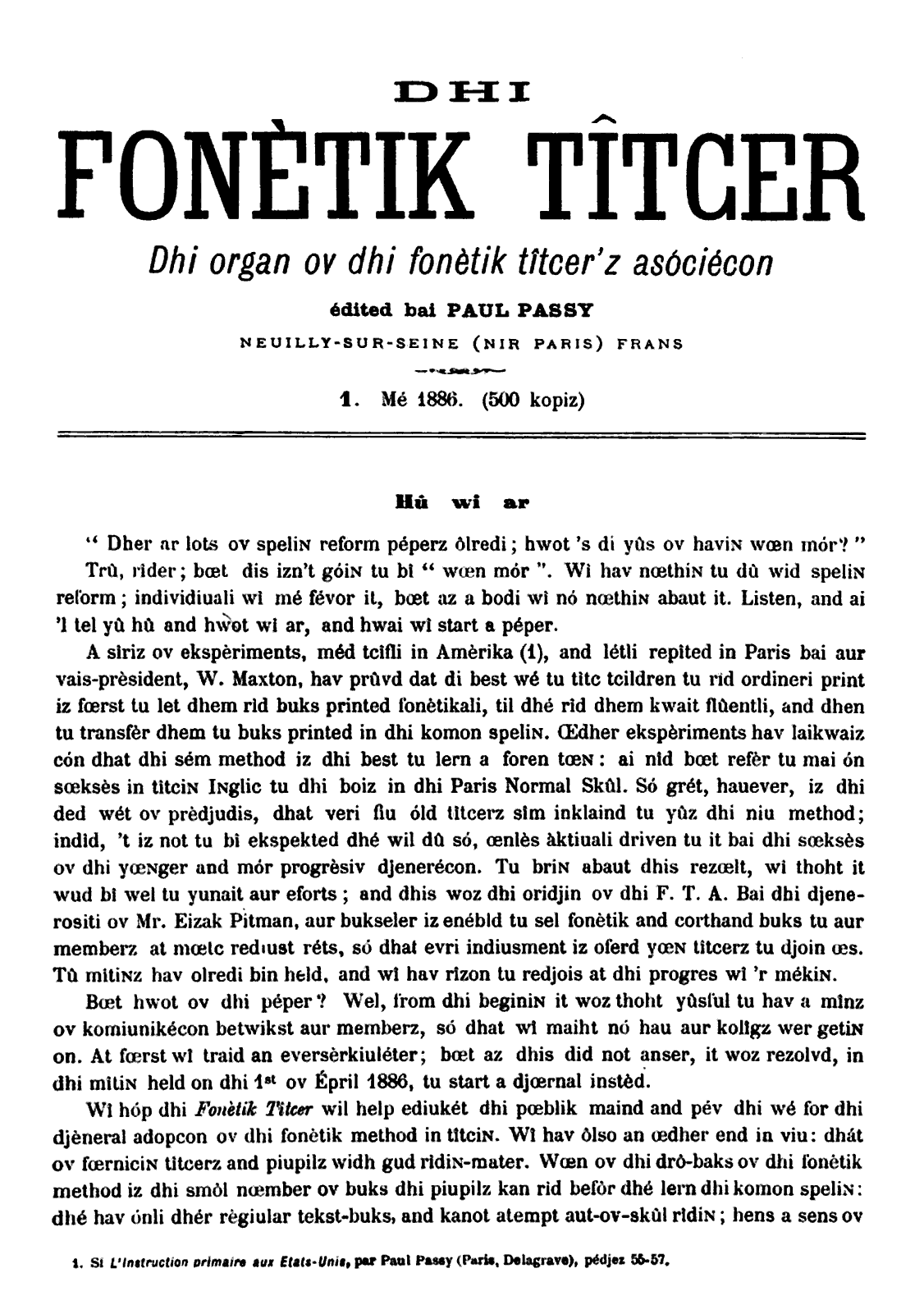
- The first issue of The Phonetic Teacher
- Discipline: Phonetics, phonology
- Language: English
- Edited by: Marija Tabain /təˈbeɪn/ (2020)

Publication details
- Former name(s): Le Maître Phonétique; The Phonetic Teacher
- History: 1886–present
- Publisher: Cambridge University Press on behalf of the International Phonetic Association
- Frequency: Triannually

Standard abbreviations
- ISO 4: J. Int. Phon. Assoc.

Indexing
- ISSN: 0025-1003 (print); 1475-3502 (web)
- LCCN: 74648541
- OCLC no.: 474783413

Links
- Journal homepage; Online archive

The Journal of the International Phonetic Association (JIPA; /ˈdʒaɪpə/) is a peer-reviewed academic journal that appears three times a year. It is published by Cambridge University Press on behalf of the International Phonetic Association. It was established as Dhi Fonètik Tîtcer ("The Phonetic Teacher") in 1886. In 1889, it was renamed Le Maître Phonétique and French was designated as the Association's official language. It was written entirely in the IPA, with its name being written accordingly as "lə mɛːtrə fɔnetik" and hence abbreviated "mf", until 1971, when it obtained its current name and began to be written in the Latin script. It covers topics in phonetics and applied phonetics such as speech therapy and voice recognition, as well as "Illustrations of the IPA" that describe individual languages using the IPA. The journal is abstracted and indexed in the MLA Bibliography.

== Editors ==
(as dhi fonètik tîtcer)

- 1886–1887 Paul Passy

(as ðə fɔnetik tîtcər)

- 1887–1888 Paul Passy

(as lə mɛːtrə fɔnetik)

- 1889-1914 Paul Passy
- 1923– Paul Passy and Daniel Jones
- –1949 Daniel Jones

(as Le Maître Phonétique)

- 1950–1968 A. C. Gimson
- 1969–1970 A. C. Gimson and John C. Wells

(as JIPA)

- 1971–1974 A. C. Gimson and John C. Wells
- 1975-1985 John C. Wells
- 1986–1989 Anthony Bladon
- 1990 (ad hoc board)
- 1990–1995 Ian Maddieson
- 1996–1999 Martin Barry
- 2000–2002? Peter Ladefoged
- 2003?– John Esling (and co-editors?)
- –2011 John Esling and Adrian P. Simpson
- 2012–2014 Adrian P. Simpson
- 2014–2015 Adrian P. Simpson and Amalia Arvaniti
- 2016–2019 Amalia Arvaniti
- 2019–present Marija Tabain

Place →	Labial					Coronal										Dorsal					Laryngeal			
Manner ↓	Bilabial		Labiodental		Linguolabial		Dental		Alveolar		Postalveolar		Retroflex		Palatal		Velar		Uvular		Pharyngeal/epiglottal		Glottal	
Nasal	m̥	m	ɱ̊	ɱ		n̼			n̥	n			ɳ̊	ɳ	ɲ̊	ɲ	ŋ̊	ŋ	ɴ̥	ɴ				
Plosive	p	b	p̪	b̪	t̼	d̼			t	d			ʈ	ɖ	c	ɟ	k	ɡ	q	ɢ	ʡ		ʔ	
Sibilant affricate									ts	dz	t̠ʃ	d̠ʒ	tʂ	dʐ	tɕ	dʑ								
Non-sibilant affricate	pɸ	bβ	p̪f	b̪v			t̪θ	d̪ð	tɹ̝̊	dɹ̝	t̠ɹ̠̊˔	d̠ɹ̠˔			cç	ɟʝ	kx	ɡɣ	qχ	ɢʁ	ʡʜ	ʡʢ	ʔh	
Sibilant fricative									s	z	ʃ	ʒ	ʂ	ʐ	ɕ	ʑ								
Non-sibilant fricative	ɸ	β	f	v	θ̼	ð̼	θ	ð	θ̠	ð̠	ɹ̠̊˔	ɹ̠˔	ɻ̊˔	ɻ˔	ç	ʝ	x	ɣ	χ	ʁ	ħ	ʕ	h	ɦ
Approximant				ʋ						ɹ				ɻ		j		ɰ						ʔ̞
Tap/flap		ⱱ̟		ⱱ		ɾ̼			ɾ̥	ɾ			ɽ̊	ɽ						ɢ̆		ʡ̆		
Trill	ʙ̥	ʙ							r̥	r			ɽ̊r̥	ɽr					ʀ̥	ʀ	ʜ	ʢ		
Lateral affricate									tɬ	dɮ			tꞎ	d𝼅	c𝼆	ɟʎ̝	k𝼄	ɡʟ̝						
Lateral fricative									ɬ	ɮ			ꞎ	𝼅	𝼆	ʎ̝	𝼄	ʟ̝						
Lateral approximant										l				ɭ		ʎ		ʟ		ʟ̠				
Lateral tap/flap									ɺ̥	ɺ			𝼈̥	𝼈		ʎ̆		ʟ̆						

		BL	LD	D	A	PA	RF	P	V	U	EG
Ejective	Stop	pʼ			tʼ		ʈʼ	cʼ	kʼ	qʼ	ʡʼ
Ejective	Affricate		p̪fʼ	t̪θʼ	tsʼ	t̠ʃʼ	tʂʼ	tɕʼ	kxʼ	qχʼ	
Ejective	Fricative	ɸʼ	fʼ	θʼ	sʼ	ʃʼ	ʂʼ	ɕʼ	xʼ	χʼ	
Ejective	Lateral affricate				tɬʼ			c𝼆ʼ	k𝼄ʼ	q𝼄ʼ	
Ejective	Lateral fricative				ɬʼ						
Click (top: velar; bottom: uvular)	Tenuis	kʘ qʘ		kǀ qǀ	kǃ qǃ		k𝼊 q𝼊	kǂ qǂ			
Click (top: velar; bottom: uvular)	Voiced	ɡʘ ɢʘ		ɡǀ ɢǀ	ɡǃ ɢǃ		ɡ𝼊 ɢ𝼊	ɡǂ ɢǂ			
Click (top: velar; bottom: uvular)	Nasal	ŋʘ ɴʘ		ŋǀ ɴǀ	ŋǃ ɴǃ		ŋ𝼊 ɴ𝼊	ŋǂ ɴǂ	ʞ		
Click (top: velar; bottom: uvular)	Tenuis lateral				kǁ qǁ						
Click (top: velar; bottom: uvular)	Voiced lateral				ɡǁ ɢǁ						
Click (top: velar; bottom: uvular)	Nasal lateral				ŋǁ ɴǁ						
Implosive	Voiced	ɓ			ɗ		ᶑ	ʄ	ɠ	ʛ	
Implosive	Voiceless	ɓ̥			ɗ̥		ᶑ̊	ʄ̊	ɠ̊	ʛ̥	
