= Thérèse Bentzon =

French Journalist

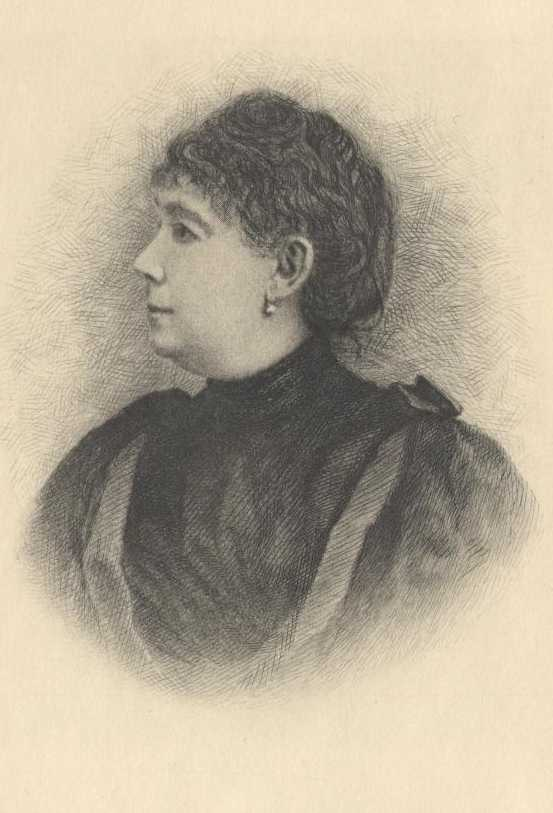
Thérèse Bentzon, or Marie-Thérèse de Solms-Blanc

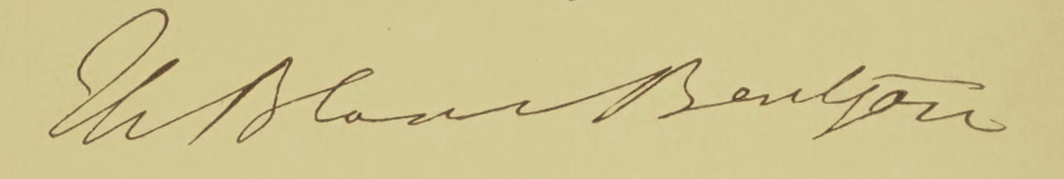
signature

Marie-Thérèse Blanc, better known by the pseudonym Thérèse Bentzon (21 September 1840 – 1907), was a French journalist, essayist and novelist, for many years on the staff of the Revue des Deux Mondes. She was born at Seine-Port, Seine-et-Marne, a small village near Paris, traveled widely in the United States, and wrote of American literature and social conditions.

== Childhood ==
Marie-Thérèse was the daughter of Edward von Solms, consul of Württemberg in Paris, and Olympe Adrienne Bentzon. She was born in the family house, owned by her grandparents. She had a brother, of whom we know nothing. Her grandmother, a woman she never mentions in her letters except to say she was a "witty and sound Parisian" was at that time remarried to the Marquis de Vitry, an old French aristocrat, born before the French Revolution, who used to tell her stories about this era.

Although her biological maternal grandfather died when her mother was very young, she mentions in her letters to Theodore Stanton that she was raised with an admiration for this unknown grandfather, Major Adrian Benjamin Bentzon, governor of the Danish West Indies from 1816 to 1820. The major, after Denmark lost the Virgin Islands, went on to file a case in the US Supreme Court arguing he should have his sugar cane plantations back. After living in America with his family, Adrian Bentzon went back to Europe, but died later in the Caribbeans. His wife later married the Marquis de Vitry, installed in the small village of Seine-Port.

Marie-Thérèse was in part raised by her grandparents and the new husband of her mother, Count Antoine Cartier D'Aure, whom her mother had married shortly after her father's death (her father was 13 years older than her mother, as her birth certificate demonstrates). At her grandparents' home she received a cosmopolitan education, learning German and English, owing to her father's origin, and having an English nurse. She was taught every day at their house by the village school teacher, and from him learned Greek, Latin and how to write.

She married in 1856 a certain Louis Blanc, but three years later, after she had a son, her husband left her. It isn't clear if he died or if they simply divorced, but she mentions in her letters to Stanton that after three years of a long and grieving time, she finally got free. But with this freedom also came the need for money to provide for her son, whose name is unknown (he is mentioned by the Goncourt brothers as the "son of Madame Blanc").

After working for different newspapers and magazines, she was introduced by her grandfather, the Count Antoine Cartier d'Aure, to George Sand, and spent a lot of time at Sand's house, in Nohant, helping her with her recording of events happening here. Sand mentions her in her journal. Her grandfather and Sand shared an interest in horses, and he had helped the writer buy some pure-breed race horses. As a thank you she agreed to read a short novel written by his granddaughter, and to present her to the then editor of the Revue des Deux Mondes, François Buloz. This was the real beginning of her writing career. As an alias, she took her mother's maiden name, and generally was known as "Théodore Bentzon" a masculine penname that voluntarily identified her as a man, for a woman writing was not well regarded in the nineteenth century.

== The Revue des Deux Mondes ==
At Sand's insistence, and helped by Victor Cherbuliez, a reluctant Buloz gave her a job as a literary critic in 1872. She stayed in the magazine up until one year before her death. Thanks to her fluent English, she was appointed to translate and review very important American and English authors, which contributed to build her a solid network in the United States.

Her work at the magazine consisted essentially in writing criticism pertaining to the Anglo-Saxon, German and Russian world. She also published most of her fictional work through the magazine, while developing her friendship with major literary figures of her time. By the time Ferdinand Brunetière was appointed the magazine's director, she had become one of its most prominent writers. She lived the best years of the magazine.

In 1893, she was sent by the Revue des Deux Mondes in the US to report on women's condition there. She left France in the first part of 1893, and from New York City went to Chicago. After spending a couple of months there, she took the train to Boston, where she spent almost a year, with trips to Louisiana and the Midwest. During her stay she went to visit Jane Addams, the founder of Hull House, met Oliver Wendell Holmes Sr. just before he died, and saw Jacob Riis on the occasion of a lecture on one of his latest novels.

She also met political, feminist, and abolitionist figures.

At her return from the US, she compiled her articles into a book, a travel journal, published in 1896 by Calmann-Levy. She visited the US again in 1897 for a shorter period. Her travel journal was a best-seller and was printed eight times, in different editions, the latest in 1904.

== The Condition of Woman in the United States ==
First published in 1896, her travel notes were organized around the observations she had made about American women. Her travel notes are not considered to have much novelty as regards her opinions about America, but the subjects she chose (education of and for women, women in society and the charity system in America) make her observations original according to William Chew's researches.

One essay was published in the May 1895 issue of McClure's Magazine. In "A Prairie College" Bentzon wrote of her visit during an eight month period in 1893-1894 to the college town of Galesburg, Illinois where she immersed herself in the town and college culture, paying particular attention to women. Ida Tarbell's introduction to the article outlined her purpose: "to see the American woman in all stages of her development, and in all lights and shades, and to study her present tendencies... ." Bentzon made observations on the life of farm women and college women, focusing on the system of co-education at Knox College, and examples of men and women meeting at college and marrying soon after. The daughter of her Galesburg host offered a challenge to Bentzon:

"Yes, many marriages are decided at college; is there any harm in it? Would it be better to meet in society, in the midst of frivolity? Do they not become much better acquainted, and in a more interesting way, when they study together for years?"

Although Bentzon concluded that there were no disadvantages to the system she observed at the prairie college, she concluded it "would not succeed in a larger city where an incessant moral surveillance could not be exercised, or where religious influences would be less direct, or where there would be temptations, or even distractions."

Her book also accords great importance to urban America, giving a thorough portrayal of it.

== Her work ==
Among her essays are Littérature et mœurs étrangères (1882) and Les nouveaux romanciers américains (1885). Her novels include:

- La vocation de Louise (1873)
- Sang mêlé (1875)
- Un remords (1878)
- Yette, histoire d'une jeune Créole (1880; 1882)
- Yvonne (1881)
- Tony (1884), crowned by the French Academy
- Contes de tous les pays (1890)
- Jacqueline (1893)
- Une double épreuve (1896)
- Au dessus de l'abime (1905)

She also wrote Nouvelle France et Nouvelle Angleterre: Notes de Voyage (1899); Choses et gens d'Amérique, Questions Americaines, and Femmes d'Amérique, and translated works by Dickens, Bret Harte, Ouida, Aldrich, and Mark Twain.

== Bibliography ==
- Chew, William: "Marie-Thérèse Blanc in America. A Fin de Siècle French Perspective of the American Woman”, in: Johan Callens (ed.): Re-discoveries of America. Meeting of Cultures, Brussel 1993, pp. 17–61.
- Sieffert, Anne-Caroline. "Thérèse Bentzon (1840-1907). Itinéraire d'une française aux Etats-Unis.", in: Le Voyage au féminin. Perspectives historiques et littéraires (18e et 20e siècle). Strasbourg: Presses universitaires de Strasbourg, 2008.
- West, Joan M.: „Th. Bentzon’s Traveler’s Notes: Redefining American Women”, in: Selecta: Journal of the Pacific Northwest Council on Foreign Languages 16 (1995), pp. 29–33.
