= Église gallicane (Loyson) =

French Christian denomination

The Église gallicane, or the Gallican Church, was a French Christian denomination founded by a former Roman Catholic priest, Hyacinthe Loyson. Loyson was considered to be the most effective pulpit orator of his day. In 1868, he was summoned to Rome and was ordered to stop preaching on any controversial subject, and to confine himself exclusively to those subjects upon which all Roman Catholics were united in belief.

With Fr. Johann Joseph Ignaz von Döllinger, Hyacinthe Loyson opposed what he saw as reactionary tendencies wrought by Vatican Council I. Loyson openly and publicly questioned the way in which the council was convened. He was also an outspoken opponent of the doctrine of Papal infallibility. In June 1869, Loyson delivered an address before the Ligue internationale de la paix, which was founded by Frédéric Passy, in which he described the Jewish religion, the Catholic religion, and the Protestant religion as the three great religions of civilized peoples. This expression elicited severe censures from the Catholic press.

Ten years later The New York Times published a jibing headline (October 30, 1883) which read:

"The entire Gallican Church, consisting of the Rev. M. LOYSON and his wife, is now in this country. M. LOYSON arrived here on Sunday last, and there is no doubt that he will be warmly received by his many admirers."

== See also ==
- Gallicanism
