= Arturo de Marcoartu =

Spanish pacifist, engineer and senator

Arturo de Marcoartu (Bilbao, 1829 – San Sebastián, 1904), XII Lord of the House of Marcoartu, was a noble Spanish pacifist, engineer and senator. He was the first Spanish nominee for a Nobel Prize (the Nobel Peace Prize), and the only Spaniard in the late 19th-century peace movement.

== History ==
His most notable work, and the beginning of his actions in the peace movement, was a 1876 book named Internationalism. In 1878, he travelled to half-a-dozen Central European capitals to argue for organised peace.

De Marcoartu was a follower of Richard Cobden's free trade beliefs, attending meetings of the Cobden Club in London. In 1889, de Marcoartu sponsored an essay competition on the "burdens of production" caused by the high taxation of militarism, with a winning prize of £150. Accepting Spanish, French, and English entries, the judges for the French submissions were Léon Say, Frédéric Passy, and Jules Simon. As the head of the Spanish Engineering Corps, he was involved in transferring Latin American concessions to the United States.

== Selected works ==
- Internationalism. Stevens and Sons. 1876.
