= Francis Nolan =

British phonetician

Francis J. Nolan is an emeritus professor of phonetics at the University of Cambridge.

Between 1993 and 1995 he was secretary of the International Phonetic Association, and from 1999 to 2003 its vice-president. He specialises in phonetics and phonology as well as in forensic linguistics. He was president of the British Association of Academic Phoneticians. He was one of the co-editors of the 1999 Handbook of the International Phonetic Association, the other being John Esling. He co-designed the language of Parseltongue featured in the Harry Potter films.
