= Peacey =

Peacey is a surname. Notable people with the surname include:

- Basil Peacey (1889–1969), British divine, Bishop of Lebombo
- Jess Lawson Peacey (1885–1965), British sculptor
- John Peacey (1896–1971), English cricketer, and minister of the Church of England

== See also ==
- Pacey
