= Edmond Potonié-Pierre =

Edmond Potonié (1829–1902), commonly known as Edmond Potonié-Pierre, was a French pacifist.

== Pacifist activism ==
During the 1850s, Potonié-Pierre was inspired by Richard Cobden's Anti-Corn Law League and aimed to do similar in France. He learnt German and Italian while travelling around Europe, and developed the liberal economics of his father to make it more socialistic and cooperative.

During the 1860s, he associated with notable thinkers like John Stuart Mill, Franz Hermann Schulze-Delitzsch, Frédéric Passy, and Rudolf Virchow. After receiving financial support from Henry Richard, Potonié-Pierre founded the Ligue du Bien Public (Public Good League). The Ligue attacked monopolies and high levels of taxation while advocating individual freedom and organised world peace.

Despite earlier support, Potonié-Pierre disagreed with Passy over his Ligue Internationale et Permanente de la Paix (International and Permanent League of Peace) due to Passy's legalistic approach towards peace and Potonié-Pierre's approach of social justice.

In 1868, the papers detailing his international contacts were seized by the French police, and their status remains unknown.

== Family ==
Potonié-Pierre's father was an entrepreneur, a friend of the author Victor Hugo.

Potonié-Pierre was the partner of Eugénie Potonié-Pierre (née Pierre), the French feminist. They refused to marry, but lived together and took each other's names. They worked together to free exiled communards, bring women the vote, campaign against poverty, and cut military expenses.

== Selected works ==
- Potonié-Pierre, Edmond (1877). La guerre à la guerre (in French).
- Un Peu Plus Tard. 1893.
- Historique du mouvement pacifiste (in French). impr. de Steiger. 1899.
