= François Racine de Monville =

French architect (1734–1797)

François Nicolas Henri Racine de Monville (French pronunciation: [fʁɑ̃swa nikɔla ɑ̃ʁi ʁasin də mɔ̃vil]; 4 October 1734 – 8 March 1797) was a French aristocrat, musician, architect and landscape designer. He is best known for his French landscape garden, the Désert de Retz, which influenced Thomas Jefferson and other later architects.

== Childhood and life at the court of Louis XV ==
François Racine de Monville was born on 4 October 1734 in the hôtel de Mesmes on rue Sainte-Avoie in Paris. He was the son of Jean Baptiste Racine du Jonquoy, the treasurer-general for Bridges and Highways and Receiver of Finances (General Tax Collector) of the town of Alençon. De Monville was raised in Paris by his maternal grandfather, Thomas Le Monnier, who gave him a good education.

== Désert de Retz ==
In 1774, de Monville bought a country estate at Saint-Jacques-de-Retz, which had a working farm, pasture, and woodlands, and a formal garden à la française attached to the main house. He resolved to create a French landscape garden in a style influenced by the English garden. He called the garden the Désert de Retz, planted four thousand trees from the royal greenhouses, rerouted a river, and created several ponds. (Note: The term 'desert' was defined at the time in the original French Encyclopedia as "a place propitious for cultivating dreams and nostalgia".)

The Désert de Retz was completed in 1785 and contained twenty-one fabriques, or architectural constructions, representing different periods of history and parts of the world. They included an artificial rock entrance, a temple of rest, an outdoor theatre, a Chinese house, a ruined Gothic church, a ruined altar, a classical tomb, an obelisque, a temple to the god Pan, a Tatar tent, and an ice-house in the form of a pyramid. The best-known feature was the ruined classical column, which was large enough to contain enough rooms to be a working residence. However, de Monville preferred to reside in the much smaller Chinese house while at the Désert.

== Bibliography ==
- Allain, Yves-Marie and Christiany, Janine, L'art des jardins en Europe, Paris, Citadelles, 2006.
- Choppin de Janvry, Olivier, Le Désert de Retz : Réponses à 101 questions sur le Désert de Retz, Croissy-sur-Seine, Société Civile du Désert de Retz, 1998.
- ---, "Le Désert de Retz," in Le Vieux Marly Tome III, No. 3, 1968–1969.
- Dufort de Cheverny, Jean-Nicolas,Mémoires sur les règnes de Louis XV et Louis XVI et sur la Révolution. Paris, Ed. Plon, Nourrit et Cie., 1886.
- Kenyon, Ronald W., Monville: Forgotten Luminary of the French Enlightenment, CreateSpace, 2013, Revised and updated in 2016.
- ---, Monville : l'inconnu des Lumières, CreateSpace, 2015.
- Prévôt, Philippe, Histoire des jardins, Editions Sud Ouest, 2006.
- Wenzler, Claude, Architecture du Jardin, Rennes, Editions Ouest-France, 2003.
- Article on De Monville by Julien Cendres in Créateurs de Jardins et de paysages en France de la Renaissance au début du XIX siècle, directed by Michel Racine, Paris, Actes Sud, École Nationale Supérieure du Paysage, 2001.
- Jardins en France : 1760–1820, Paris, Caisse nationale des monuments historiques et des sites, 1978.
