= Joseph Martin-Paschoud =

Joseph Martin (14 October 1802; Nîmes – 1873) commonly known as Joseph Martin-Paschoud, was a French liberal Protestant pastor. He served as a pastor in Luneray and Lyon, before serving as a pastor in Paris from 1837 until his death.

As a supporter of Athanase Josué Coquerel, even after his theological transgressions, Martin-Paschoud came into conflict with the Union Protestante Libérale (Liberal Protestant Union) over their refusal to reinstate his position. In January 1866, the Union's presbyteral council attempted to force Martin-Paschoud into retirement, but they were unsuccessful when the presiding minister refused to authorise the action.

Martin-Paschoud crossed religious lines throughout his career, attending the investiture ceremony of Zadoc Kahn as Chief Rabbi of Paris. He gave his support to the peace society founded by Catholic economist Frédéric Passy in 1867.
