= Hyacinthe Loyson =

French preacher and theologian

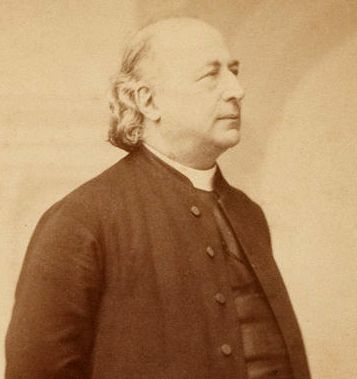
- Portrait by Pierre Petit
- Born: Charles Jean Marie Loyson; 10 March 1827; Orléans, France
- Died: 9 February 1912 (aged 84); Paris, France
- Years active: 1845–1912
- Spouse: Emilie Jane Butterfield Loyson
- Children: Paul Hyacinthe Loyson
- Church: Roman Catholic Church

Charles Jean Marie Loyson (10 March 1827 – 9 February 1912), better known by his religious name Père Hyacinthe, was a famous French preacher and theologian. He was a Roman Catholic priest who had been a Sulpician and a Dominican novice before becoming a Discalced Carmelite and provincial of his order, but left the Roman Catholic Church, in 1869, after major excommunication was pronounced against him. He was known especially for his eloquent sermons at Notre Dame de Paris and sought to reconcile Catholicism with modern ideas.

== Biography ==
Loyson was born in Orléans, France, on 10 March 1827. He was baptised Charles Jean Marie; named after the poet Charles Loyson, his uncle. He was educated in Pau, Pyrénées-Atlantiques, by private professors where his father was rector of the university. His mother was of the noble Burnier-Fontonel family of the Chateau de Reiquier, Savoy. One brother, Jules Theodore Loyson, became a priest and professor at the Collège de Sorbonne in Paris, and one sister became a nun.

In 1845, he entered the seminary of Saint-Sulpice, Paris and was ordained four years later. He successively taught philosophy at the seminary in Avignon, and theology at the seminary in Nantes and officiated in his ecclesiastical capacity at Saint-Sulpice. He eventually resigned his post to assume the vows of a friar of the Order of the Carmelites, taking the religious name of Hyacinthe. He then spent two years in the Carmelite convent in Lyon, and attracted much attention by his preaching at the Lycée in Lyons.

As a preacher in Lyon and Bordeaux, Loyson acquired his reputation as the most effective pulpit orator of his day; and his success soon afterwards induced him to seek the more critical audiences of Paris, where Loyson further established his fame at the Église de la Madeleine and Notre Dame de Paris. Mullinger wrote that Loyson's "resonant voice and impassioned rhetoric possess, especially for his own countrymen, a powerful charm." His eloquence drew all Paris to his Advent sermons in Notre Dame de Paris between 1865 and 1869, but his orthodoxy fell under suspicion. In 1868, he was summoned to Rome and was ordered to stop preaching on any controversial subject, and to confine himself exclusively to those subjects upon which all Roman Catholics were united in belief.

In June 1869, Loyson delivered an address before the Ligue internationale de la paix, which was founded by Frédéric Passy, in which he spoke of the Jewish religion, the Catholic religion, and the Protestant religion, as being the three great religions of civilized peoples; this expression elicited severe censures from the Catholic press. In 1869, he protested against the manner in which the First Vatican Council was convened.

He was ordered to retract, but he refused and broke with his order in an open letter of 20 September 1869, addressed to the General of the Discalced Carmelites, but evidently intended for the governing powers of the Church. In it he protested against the "sacrilegious perversion of the Gospel", and went on to say: "It is my profound conviction that if France in particular and the Latin races in general, are given up to social, moral, and religious anarchy, the principal cause is not Catholicism itself, but the manner in which Catholicism has for a long time been understood and practised." His manifesto against the alleged abuses in the Church created intense excitement, not only in France, but throughout the civilized world, and the young monk was hailed as a powerful ally by all the open opponents of the Papacy.

He was excommunicated and resumed his name as Charles Loyson. Soon after, he left France for America, landing in New York City on 18 October 1869. He was warmly welcomed by the leading members of the various Protestant sects in the United States, and though he fraternized with them to a certain extent, he constantly declared that he had no intention of quitting the Catholic Faith. In 1870 he associated himself with Ignaz von Döllinger's protest against the dogma of Papal infallibility.

On 3 September 1872, he was married in London at the Marylebone Registry Office, to Emilie Jane Butterfield Meriman, daughter of Amory Butterfield and widow of Edwin Ruthven Meriman of the United States; the Dean of Westminster, Arthur Stanley, and Lady Augusta Stanley, his wife, were present. He claimed that in 1872, before he was publicly married in England, he had his marriage privately blessed in Rome by Archbishop Luigi Puecher Passavalli.

A law was enacted that restricted episcopal and parochial jurisdiction in the canton unless sanctioned by the government; and that, for the future, all parish priests should be elected by the Catholic inhabitants, and be removed, if shown sufficient cause, by the State. (Note: Mullinger noted that curates were required to take an oath to the Swiss constitution, and could be suspended for four years if found guilty of violating their oath.) The canton was divided into twenty-three parishes, three of which were in Geneva; and in the following March, Loyson was invited by the Old Catholics to lecture in Geneva. In a series of discourses he boldly advocated a complete system of Church reform, to be carried out in conjunction with the Old Catholic party.

He urged that every nation establish a national Christian Church and the different established Churches become an international confederation. His views and talents were regarded favorably. Loyson was elected, by liberal Catholics, in the following October, in 1873, along with Hurtault and Chavard, to the three vacant parishes in Geneva. It was impossible for the bishop to retaliate under Swiss law. In 1874, he introduced reforms in worship and soon had to resign. Identified as one of the Old Catholics, Loyson continued to write and preach and ultimately settled in Paris in 1877 and established as a separate church the Église gallicane, which drew upon the long French tradition of Gallicanism.

He died in February 1912, in Paris, in the apartment of his playwright son, Paul Hyacinthe Loyson, and was buried in Père Lachaise Cemetery.
