= House of Marcoartu =

Ancient Spanish aristocratic family

The House of Marcoartu (Spanish: Casa de Marcoartu) is an ancient Spanish aristocratic family (Spanish: Familia de Marcoartu), descended from the House of Gascony, present in the European bourgeoisie. The etymology of the name comes from the north of Spain.

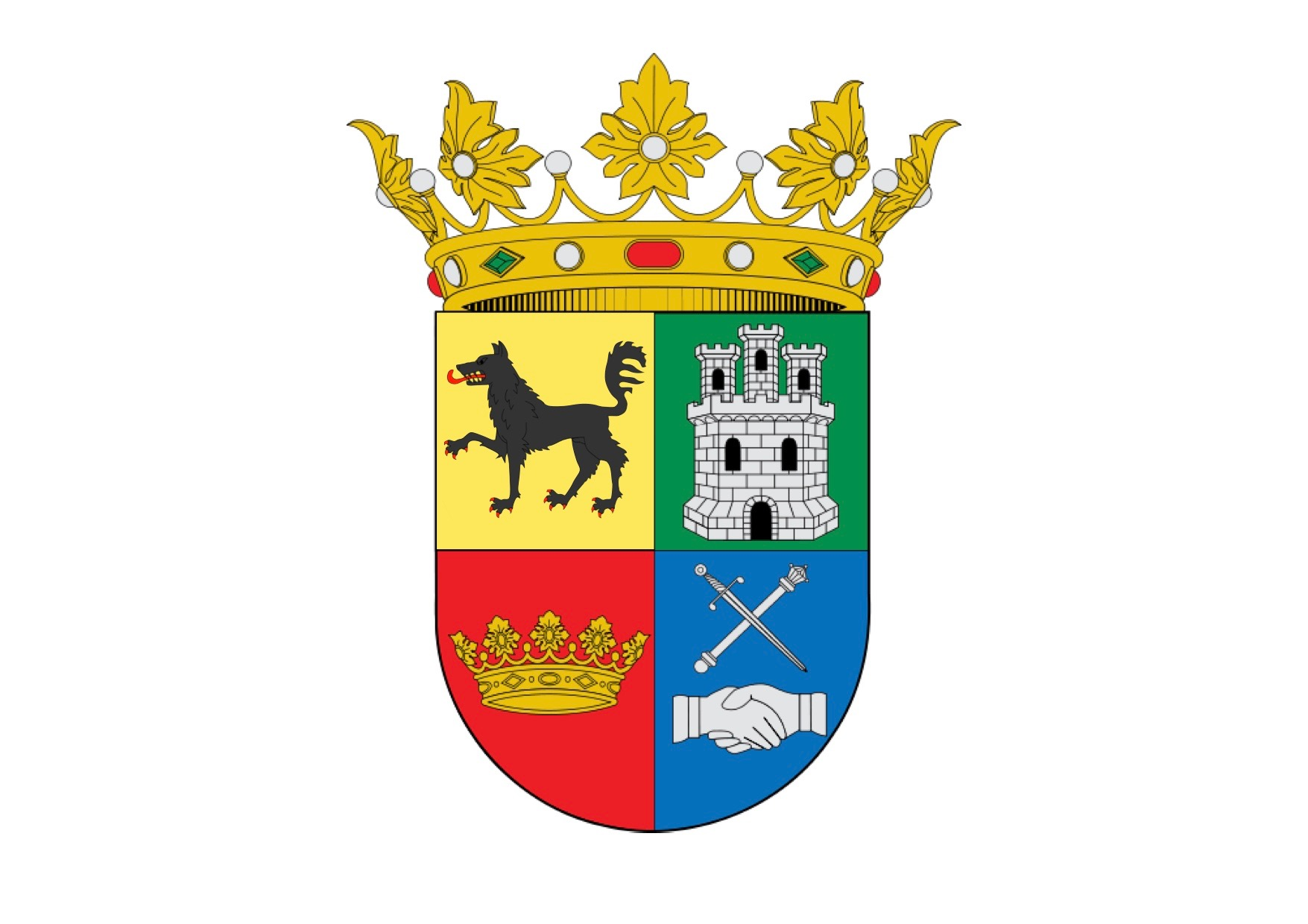
Coat of arms of the Marcoartu family

As only the firstborn male was allowed to inherit, several members of the Marcoartu family emigrated to the Paris (France), Geneva (Switzerland) and London (United Kingdom) during and after the colonial reign. After the Napoleonic invasion in 1808 French army occupied the Marcoartu palace, as well as other properties of the family for several years. After so, the family kept the palace and the art pieces in place.

== History ==
The House of Marcoartu was started by Guillermo de Marcoartu (b. ? – d. 1040). He was the son of the Duchy of Gascony (Duchy of Gascony) who was granted the castle and lands of Marcoartu in the Basque Country, Spain. Guillermo I took the name Guillermo de Marcoartu in accordance with proper naming traditions upon being granted a landed title. Guillermo I married Valentina of Graeff (b. 1000 – d. 1063). Their first child, Ramon de Marcoartu, II Senyor de Casa de Marcoartu. Their second son, Bernardo de Marcoartu became the Ardiaca (Archdeacon) of Gascony. The third son, Raimundo de Marcoartu went on to become the Senyor of the House (Lord of the House) and became the first head of the House of Marcoartu.
