= Carol Chapelle =

Tunisian linguist and Angela B

- Born: August 18, 1955 (age 71)

Academic background
- Education: University of Illinois at Urbana–Champaign

Academic work
- Discipline: Linguist
- Sub-discipline: Second language acquisition
- Institutions: Iowa State University

Carol Ann Chapelle (born August 18, 1955) is an American linguist and Angela B. Pavitt Professor in English at Iowa State University.

Chapelle earned a doctorate in linguistics from the University of Illinois at Urbana–Champaign and began teaching at Iowa State University in 1985. She was editor of the TESOL Quarterly from 1999 to 2004. In 2010, Chappelle was named a distinguished professor. She was appointed Angela B. Pavitt Professor in English in March 2015.

== Publications ==
- Argument-based validation in testing and assessment, 2021
- Computer applications in second language acquisition : foundations for teaching, testing and research, 1982
- English language learning and technology : lectures on applied linguistics in the age of information and communication technology, 2003
- Assessing language through computer technology, 2006
- Building a validity argument for the Test of English as a Foreign Language, 2007
- Tips for teaching with CALL : practical approaches to computer-assisted language learning, 2008
- The handbook of technology and second language teaching and learning, 2017
- Teaching culture in introductory foreign language textbooks, 2016
