= Bernard Serrigny =

French general

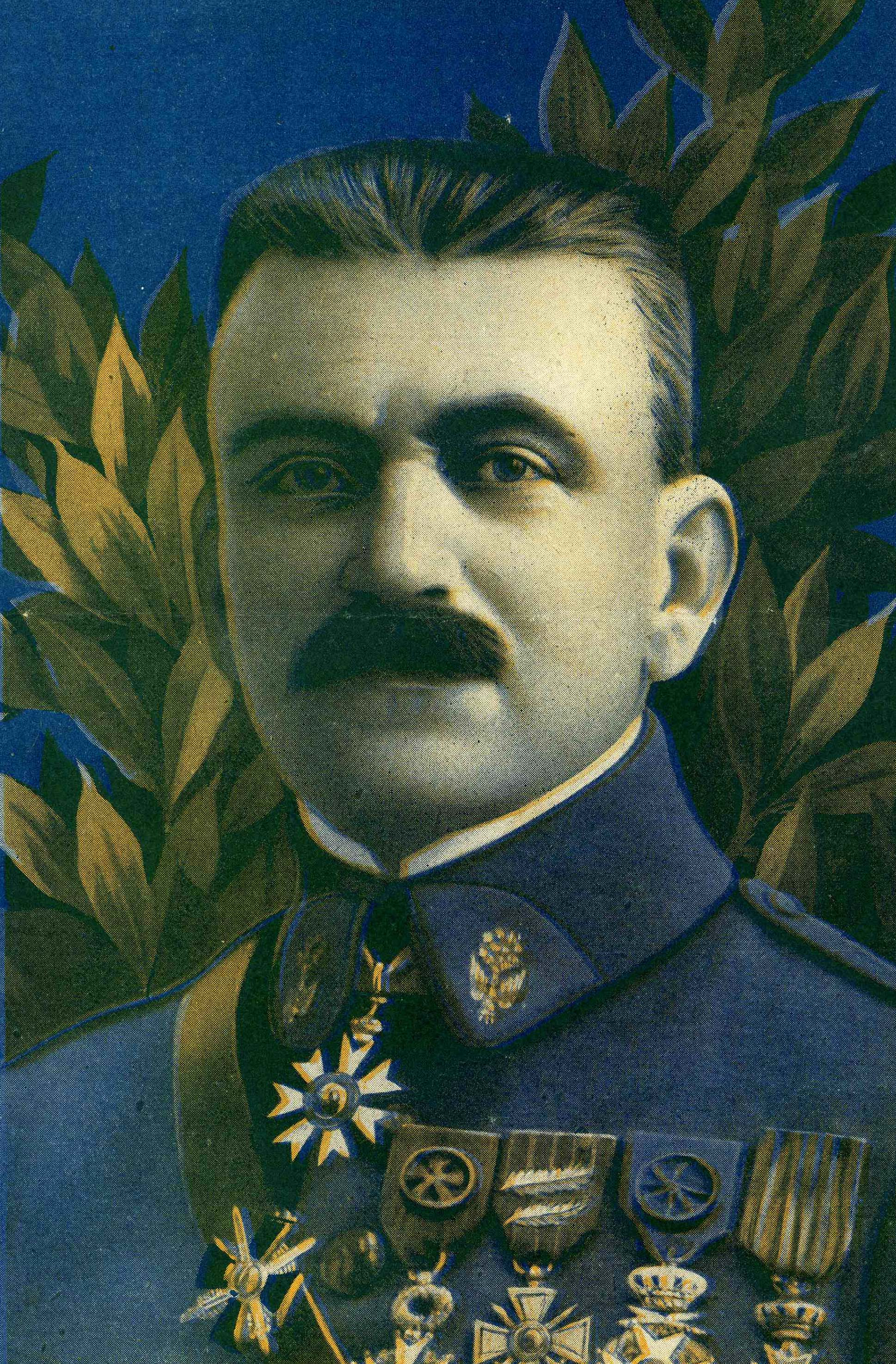
- Allegiance: France
- Rank: General

Bernard Serrigny (1870–1954) was a French general.

Serrigny was a captain at the start of World War I, and aide to Philippe Pétain.

During the 1920s, Serrigny was the general secretary of the Conseil Supérieur de la Défense Nationale (High Council of National Defence).

In 1924, Serrigny published an article in Revue des Deux Mondes advocating for the proper management of French resources, colonial and otherwise, during times of war.

== Works ==
- Les conséquences économiques et sociales de la prochaine guerre d'après les enseignements des campagnes de 1870-71 et de 1904-1905. Paris: V. Giard & E. Brière. 1909.
- Trente ans avec Pétain. Paris. 1959.
