= Désert de Retz =

Coordinates: 48°53′34″N 2°0′56″E

The Désert de Retz is a garden on the edge of the forêt de Marly in the commune of Chambourcy, in north-central France. It was created at the end of the 18th century by the aristocrat François Racine de Monville on his 40-hectare (99-acre) estate. The architect Boullée was involved in the creation of both Monville's town houses; it is less likely he had much do with the Désert de Retz, although Monville did, for a while, engage him as assistant to the architect Francois Barbier until 1780. Monville probably designed many of the features and structures himself, or had a strong supervisory role.

The garden included between 17 and 20 structures, of which ten still survive, mostly referring to classical antiquity. Those buildings included a summer house (the "colonne brisée", or ruined column), in the form of the base of a shattered column from an imaginary gigantic temple, an ice house in the form of an Egyptian pyramid, an obelisk, a colonnaded temple dedicated to Pan, an open-air theatre, a ruined Gothic Chapel and a Chinese pavilion. This was one of a number of landscape gardens created in France at the time influenced by English examples. Its style could be described as Anglo-Chinois, or French landscape garden.

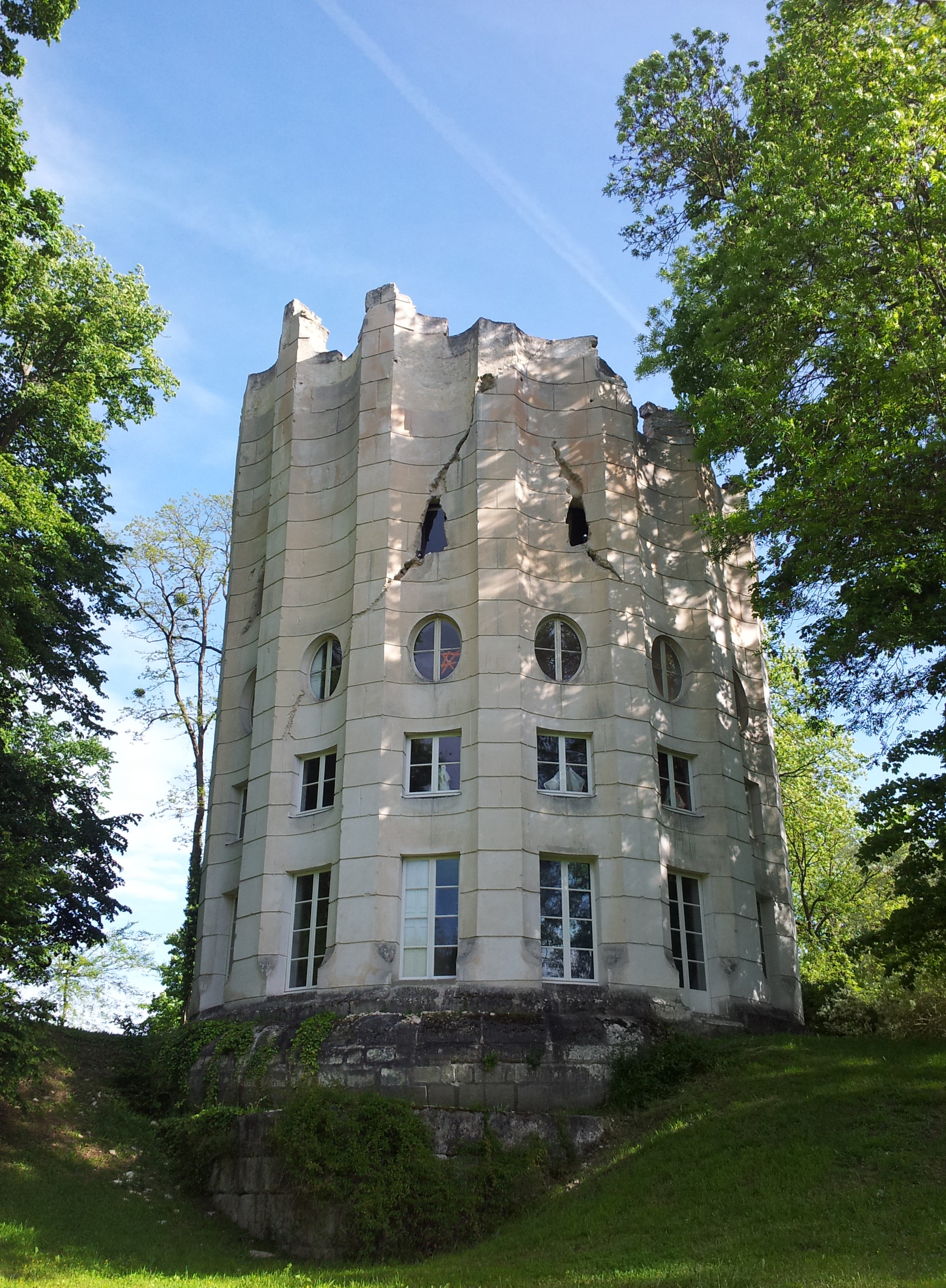
"La colonne détruite"

== History ==
In 1774, Monville bought the estate of about 13 hectares (32 acres) from Antoine Joseph Basire. It included an existing house, a formal parterre garden and service quarters. By 1785 he had extended the estate to 90 arpents (31 ha) in size.

- 1777–78 The Chinese House is constructed
- 1780 A lawsuit requires Monville to pay Francois Barbier £6,000 for his work as a 'designer'. The records of the suit designates Monville with the designs of the Temple of Pan and the Chinese House while designating Barbier as the originator of the designs of the Temple of Repos, the obelisk and the greenhouses. Barbier is also paid for supervising the construction of the Pyramid Ice House.
- 1781 The Pyramid Icehouse (Une glacière en forme de pyramide) is completed. On 5 August 1781, Queen Marie Antoinette makes the first of many visits to the Désert.
- 1782 The Column House is completed.
- 1785 George-Louis le Rouge, King's Geographer, publishes a series of 24 engravings of the Désert de Retz in Cahier 13 of his 21 Cahiers des Jardins Anglo-Chinois.

In July 1792, Monville sold the Désert and his two hôtels in Paris to the Englishman Lewis Disney Ffytche and as the property of an English subject these were seized and sold in 1793 on the outbreak of the War of the First Coalition. Monville moves to the Rue Neuve des Mathurins in Paris with his companion Sarah, a young actress.

- 1793 Monville moves again, to a house in Neuilly.
- In 1811, Lebigre Beaurepaire bought the Désert, but he did not honour his debts, and the estate was again seized.
- In 1816 it was sold back to Disney Ffytche after the Bourbon Restoration.

Ffytche's grandson Augustus William Hillary took possession in 1824 and sold it in 1827 to a notary of Saint-Germain-en-Laye, Maître Alexandre Marie Denis. Denis sold it in 1839 to Jean-François Bayard, a nephew of Eugène Scribe.

In 1856, Jean-François Bayard's widow ceded it to Frédéric Passy (1822-1912) and his son Pierre (born on the estate) added a hen farm but in 1936 was forced to sell the estate due to financial difficulties, with the buyer being Georges Courtois.

- 1936 Courtois buys the property via par a société named Neueberg. When he realised how much work was needed to restore the Désert (now nearly in ruins), the new owner decided not to do so, though the architect Jean-Charles Moreux bemoaned its ruined state.

In 1938 it was decided to list the estate and its buildings, which happened on 9 December 1938, resulting in a decree signed on 30 August 1939, and published 25 November 1939. However, the société owning it changed the statutes, forcing the authorities to resume the procedure to have the Désert finally classed as a monument historique, which came with a decree of 9 April 1941, against the owners' wishes. At this period the Chinese House, being constructed of wood began to seriously decay - it has since disappeared.

On 8 December 1966, André Malraux, then minister of culture, strongly evoked the estate's state before the Assemblée Nationale l’état du domaine and had them vote for the law of 30 December 1966, which allowed the Désert to be saved. The main effect of this law was to force a building's owner to pay 50% of the cost of the work. On 31 December 1981, the Worms group bought the Désert and gave it to the Société Civile du Désert de Retz.

Since 1992 part of the former estate has been occupied by the Joyenval golf course. A major restoration of the main gardens and several of the structures was undertaken in the 1990s.

== Structures ==
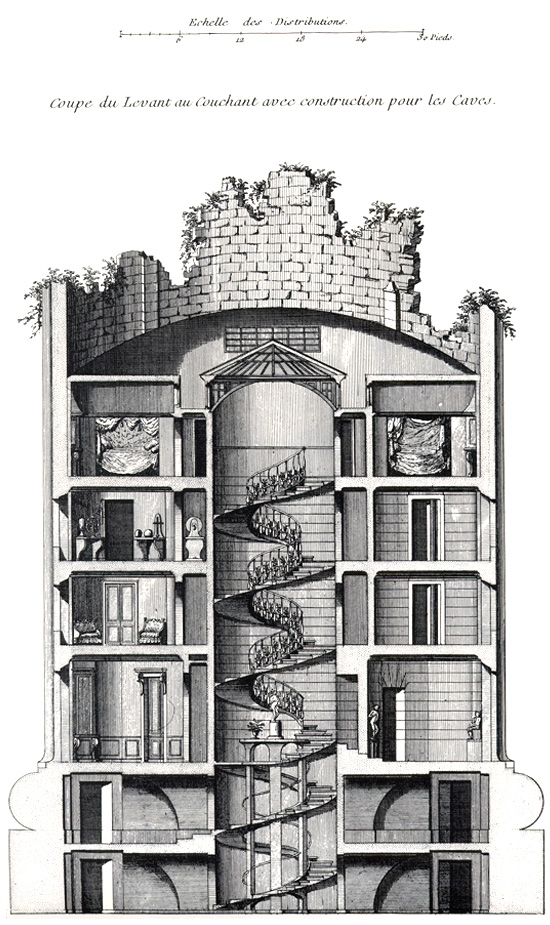
Cross-section of the Colonne détruite

The 1785 plan in Monville's hand mentions:

- The ruined column
- Rock at the entrance to the garden (with attendant Satyrs)
- Temple to the God Pan
- Ruined Gothic church
- Chinese house
- Dairy
- a "Métairie arrangée"
- Hermitage
- Orangery
- "Isle du Bonheur" (Isle of Happiness)
- Greenhouses
- a "Chaumière" or thatched cottage
- Tomb
- Pyramid icehouse
- Obelisk
- "Communs"
- open-air theatre.

To this list may be added:

- Tartar tent
- Temple of repose
- Little Altar.

== Le Desert de Retz and Freemasonry ==
There are theories that the landscape was designed to allude to intellectual concepts and mysticism, specifically Free Masonry, although the evidence is inconclusive. De Monville certainly had many friends and acquaintances who were prominent Freemasons (including the Duc de Chartres) but it was common in Paris at the time and there is no direct evidence he was one himself. Similarly De Monville's friendship with Thomas Jefferson, whose presence in various Masonic lodges in Paris is well-documented, and who certainly visited the Désert de Retz is not, in itself conclusive evidence.

Monville's friend, Louis Philippe II, Duc de Chartres and d'Orléans, was a leading Freemason in pre-revolutionary France who apparently incorporated into his garden at the Parc Monceau in Paris an initiatory route complete with Masonic symbols. This was in line with other gardens of the period with masonic connections; these include Louisenlund in Schleswig-Holstein created by the Landgrave Carl von Hessen-Kassel, Wörlitz in Sachsen-Anhalt, created by Prince Friedrich Franz von Anhalt-Dessau, the Royal York zur Freundschaft in Berlin and Basil von Armann's garden at Aigen near Salzburg. Each of these gardens, including the Parc Monceau, included a pavilion specifically designed to serve as a Masonic Lodge.

It is possibly significant that De Monville designed structures for the Duke's Parc Monceau garden but their exact connection with the masonic theme is unknown as the garden doesn't survive intact and little detail of the structures in question exists. A similar garden was created by the Marquis de Montesquiou-Fezensac (Anne-Pierre de Montesquiou-Fezensac 1739-1798) at Mauperthuis in suburban Paris with structures by Claude Nicolas Ledoux and Alexandre-Théodore Brongniart, all three of whom were freemasons. The Pyramid of 1764 by Ledoux was purportedly used as a masonic lodge.

During Monville's time a printed guide to the garden was produced but its vagueness creates more questions than it supplies answers; it includes an illustration of satyrs with flaming torches greeting visitors at the artificial rock entrance; there is no explanation as to whether they are costumed staff, statues or merely a poetic allegory (although apparently years later two "satyrs" -presumably cutouts - were discovered in a store room). They and the artificial rock entrance could be part of an initiatory route used for Masonic purposes. Several of the other garden features (truncated column, pyramid etc.) could likewise be interpreted as being suggestive of a masonic theme but they also exist is other gardens where no such connection is likely or seriously suggested.

Diana Ketcham's opinion is that the physical layout of the Desert de Retz makes the Masonic connection implausible as it is "a small open valley, where nothing is hidden, the site is not conducive to a ritual progression where the initiate views only one scene at a time". If there was a definite connection between Freemasonry and the garden design at le Désert de Retz it is odd that no contemporary source mentions it when the Duc De Orleans' garden at the Parc Monceau and the Marquis of Montesquiou's at Mauperthuis were no secret.

== Famous visitors ==
The garden was visited around the time of its creation by Gustav III of Sweden (to whom Monville offered some drawings) as well as Marie Antoinette, her brother the Holy Roman Emperor Joseph II, the Prince de Ligne, the Duc de Chartres, the painter Hubert Robert and possibly Benjamin Franklin. The American Ambassador to France, later President Thomas Jefferson visited in September 1786 with Maria Cosway, he was so inspired by the internal planning of the ruined column that several of his architectural projects show strong influences.

In the 20th century, many famous persons became interested in the Désert and visited the garden: artists Salvador Dalí, Louis Aragon and Hans Arp in 1927, Raymond Lécuyer in 1938, Cyril Connolly in 1945, author André Pieyre de Mandiargues in 1946, Osvald Siren in 1949, the Duke and Duchess of Windsor in 1950, André Breton and 23 other surrealists in 1960, Jacqueline Kennedy Onassis in 1979, former US President Jimmy Carter in 1983, French President Mitterrand in 1990, and the architect I. M. Pei in 1994.

Other visitors include Colette, Jean Cocteau, Elsie de Wolfe, Olga Carlisle, Jacques Prevert and others including the photographers Jerome Zerbe, Suzanne La Font, Geoffrey James, Osvald Siren, Emmanuelle Gaboryand, and Michael Kenna. It also inspired Collette's Paradis Terrestre.

At least three films include scenes shot at the Desert de Retz. In 1923 French director Abel Gance used the Desert de Retz as a decor for his film Au Secours!, starring Max Linder. In June 1994 the director James Ivory used it for scenes in his film Jefferson in Paris, starring Nick Nolte, Greta Scacchi and Jean Pierre Aumont.

== Bibliography ==
- Ronald W. Kenyon, Monville: Forgotten Luminary of the French Enlightenment, CreateSpace,2013. Biography in English devoted to François Racine de Monville. Extensive index and bibliography. (ISBN 978-1481148290)
- Ronald W. Kenyon, Monville: l’inconnu des Lumières, CreateSpace, 2015. Version en français de le l'ouvrage y compris index et bibliographie. (ISBN 978-1500413842)
- Louis-Eugène Lefevre, Le Jardin anglais et la singulière habitation du Désert de Retz près de Marly, Paris éd. Jean Schemit, 1917, tiré à part du Bulletin de la Commission des Antiquités et des Arts de Seine-et-Oise.
- Pierre-Émile Renard, Chambourcy, son passé, 1980
- Pierre-Émile Renard, Chambourcy et le Désert de Retz, 1984
- Michel Dach, Le Désert de Retz à la lumière d’un angle particulier, 1995
- Le Désert de Retz, texte anonyme publié en avril 1988 par la Société Civile du Désert de Retz, Croissy sur Seine.
- Julien Cendres, Chloé Radiguet, Le Désert de Retz, paysage choisi, éditions de l'éclat, septembre 2009, nouvelle édition revue et augmentée
- Le Désert de Retz. Philippe Grunchec, photographies. Préface de Jean-Jacques Aillagon, postface de Julien Cendres, Éditions Gourcuff-Gradenigo, 2013 (ISBN 978-2-35340-167-3).
- Le Désert de Retz: A Late Eighteenth-Century French Folly Garden Diana Ketcham· The Artful Landscape of Monsieur de Monville – 1997.
- Performance and Appropriation: Profane Rituals in Gardens and Landscapes Michel Conan, Dumbarton Oaks, 2007.
