= Pacey =

Origin
- Region of origin: England

Other names
- Variant forms: Passy, Passie, Peacey, Piosey

Pacey is an English surname and given name variant of Passy, a French locational origin surname, itself derived from the Gallo-Roman Praenomen Paccius. The surname Pacey migrated to England during the 12th Century and eventually evolved also into a given name. Pacey, itself a variant, is associated also with "Passie" (but not "Passi"), "Peacey", and "Piosey".

Notable people and characters with the name include:

== Surname ==
- Dave Pacey (1936–2016), English footballer
- Dennis Pacey (1928–2009), English footballer
- Desmond Pacey (1917–1975), Canadian literary critic
- Elizabeth Pacey, Canadian writer
- Eric Pacey (born 1978), Canadian lacrosse player
- Frank Pacey (1926–2007), British sports shooter
- Henry Pacey (c.1669–1729), British politician
- Jeptha Pacey (died 1862), British architect, surveyor and building contractor
- Julie Pacey (1955/1956–1994), English murder victim
- Simon Pacey (born 1974), Canadian rugby union player
- Steven Pacey (born 1957), English actor

== Given name ==
- Pacey Witter (born 1983), fictional character on Dawson's Creek
