= Jules Desnoyers =

French geologist and archaeologist

- Born: 8 October 1800; Nogent-le-Rotrou, France
- Died: 1 September 1887 (aged 86)
- Notable work: Recherches géologiques et historiques sur les cavernes
- Scientific career
- Fields: geology archaeology
- Institutions: Muséum National d'Histoire Naturelle

Jules Pierre François Stanislaus Desnoyers (8 October 1800 – 1 September 1887) was a French geologist and archaeologist.

== Life ==
Desnoyers was born at Nogent-le-Rotrou, in the department of Eure-et-Loir. Becoming interested in geology at an early age, he was one of the founders of the Geological Society of France in 1830. In 1834, he was appointed librarian of the Muséum National d'Histoire Naturelle in Paris. He was elected a Foreign Member of the Geological Society of London in 1864. Parts of his collection of rare books in the earth sciences was bought by the United States Geological Survey Library at an auction in 1885. He was the Secretary of the Historical Society since its founding.

== Speleological activities ==
Desnoyers was a spelunker. His article on caves for the Dictionnaire universel d’histoire naturelle (1841–1849) of Charles Henry Dessalines d'Orbigny broke new ground, emphasizing the role of hydrological phenomena in limestone and gypsum caves. He explored the subterranean quarries of the Île-de-France. He was one of the first to study small mammals that lived in zones of karstic infill.

== Works ==
His contributions to geological science comprise memoirs on the Jurassic, Cretaceous and Tertiary Strata of the Paris Basin and of Northern France, and other papers relating to the antiquity of man, and to the question of his co-existence with extinct mammalia. In 1829 he proposed the term Quaternary to cover those formations which were formed just anterior to the present, following an antiquated method of referring to geologic eras as "Primary," "Secondary," "Tertiary," and so on.

His separate books were Sur la Craie et sur les terrains tertiaires du Cotentin (1825) and Recherches géologiques et historiques sur les cavernes (1845).

== Bibliography ==
- Desnoyers, Jules. 1836. Indication des principaux ouvrages propres à faciliter les travaux relatifs à l'histoire de France, par M. J. Desnoyers. Paris: impr. de Crapelet.
- Desnoyers, Jules. 1859. Note de M. Desnoyers,... sur des empreintes de pas d'animaux dans le gypse des environs de Paris, et particulièrement de la vallée de Montmorency, par M. J. Desnoyers. Paris: impr. de L. Martinet. Extrait du "Bulletin de la Société géologique de France". 2e série. T. XVI. Séance du 4 juillet 1859.
- Desnoyers, Jules. 1862. Note sur les argiles à silex de la craie, sur les sables du Perche et d'autres dépôts tertiaires qui leur sont subordonnés, par M. J. Desnoyers. Paris: impr. de Martinet. Extrait du "Bulletin de la Société géologique de France". 2e série. T. XIX. Séance du 16 décembre 1861.
- Desnoyers, Jules. 1863. Note sur les indices matériels de la coexistence de l'homme avec l'Elephas meridionalis dans un terrain des environs de Chartres: plus ancien que les terrains de transport quaternaires des vallées de la Somme et de la Seine. Aus: Comptes rendus des séances de l'Acad. des Sciences; 56.1863.
- Desnoyers, J. 1863. Résponse à des objections faites au sujet de stries et d'incisions constatées sur des ossements de mammifères fossiles des environs de Chartres. From Institut de France-Académie des sciences. Comptes rendu, séance du 8 juin 1863.
- Desnoyers, Jules. 1870. "Observations relatives à la découverte récente de l'amphithéâtre romain de Paris". Comptes-Rendus Des Séances De L Année - Académie Des Inscriptions Et Belles-Lettres. 14 (1): 73–75.
- Desnoyers, Jules. 1875. "Note relative à un galet en silex trouvé aux environs d'Amiens". Comptes-Rendus Des Séances De L Année - Académie Des Inscriptions Et Belles-Lettres. 19 (2): 96–98.
- Desnoyers, J. 1882. Notice sur le fossile à odeur de truffes. From Mémoires de la Société d'histoire naturelle de Paris. t. 1.
- Desnoyers, Jules. 1884. Rapport sur les travaux de la Société de l'histoire de France depuis sa dernière assemblée générale en mai 1883, jusqu'à ce jour (lu à l'assemblée générale du 20 mai 1884) par M. J. Desnoyers,... (Extrait de l'Annuaire-Bulletin de la Société de l'Histoire de France).
- Desnoyers, Jules. 1887. Note sur un monogramme d'un prêtre artiste du IXe siècle. Comptes Rendus Des Séances De L'Académie Des Inscriptions Et Belles-Lettres. [Paris]: Imprimerie Nationale.
- Delisle, Léopold Victor, and Jules Desnoyers. 1875. Notice sur un manuscrit mérovingien contenant des fragments d'Eugyppius appartenant à M. Jules Desnoyers par Léopold Delisle.-Paris: Picard 1875. Paris: Picard.
- Galeron, Fréd, A. de Brébisson, and J. Desnoyers. 1993. Falaise: statistique de l'arrondissement. Paris: Res Universis.
- Delisle, Léopold, and Jules Desnoyers. 1888. Collections de M. Jules Desnoyers: Catalogue des manuscrits anciens & des Chartes; Notice sur un recueil historique du XVIIIe siècle Par Marcel de Fréville.
- Malloizel, Godefroy, Jules Desnoyers, Charles Brongniart, and Adolphe Pacault. 1886. Oeuvres scientifiques de Michel-Eugène Chevreul doyen des étudiants de France 1806–1886. Paris: [Rouen, Impr. J. Lecerf].
