= Paul Passy =

French linguist, founder of the IPA (1859–1940)

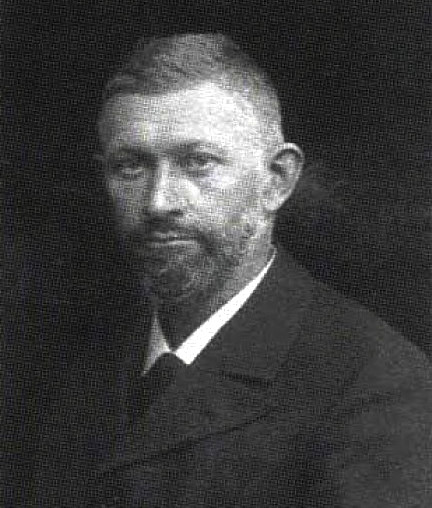
Passy in 1901

Paul Édouard Passy (French: [pɔl edwaʁ pasi]; 13 January 1859, Versailles – 21 March 1940, Bourg-la-Reine) was a French linguist, founder of the International Phonetic Association in 1886. He took part in the elaboration of the International Phonetic Alphabet.

== Early life ==
Paul Passy was born into a notable French family: his father Frédéric, a noted economist and politician, was the first recipient (along with Henry Dunant) of the Nobel Peace Prize in 1901. Passy mastered English, German, and Italian as a child, and studied Sanskrit at the École des Hautes Études. He graduated from university at 19 and spent ten years as a language teacher (English and German) in public schools as an alternative to military service. Around this time he also became a committed Christian.

== Career ==
Passy was largely self-taught in phonetics; his interest was prompted by his dissatisfaction with the methods of language teaching at the time. In 1886, Passy founded the Phonetic Teachers' Association, which later became the International Phonetic Association. His friend Otto Jespersen was an early member of the association.

Passy gave private lessons in phonetics and French pronunciation at his home in Bourg-la-Reine; among his students was Daniel Jones. In 1894, he took up a chair in General and Comparative Phonetics at the École des Hautes Études (a position created especially for him), and by 1897 had become an assistant director of the school. Apart from a four-year hiatus beginning in 1913, when he was dismissed on political grounds for opposing an extension to mandatory military service, he remained at the École des Hautes Études until his retirement in 1926.

In 1896, he began to give lectures and practical phonetics classes at the Sorbonne, where he was the first teacher to insist that women be allowed to attend his classes.

== Religion ==
Passy was devoted to Christian socialism. He founded an agricultural colony called Liéfra, named after Liberté, égalité, fraternité, near Fontette, Aube.
