= International Phonetic Association =

London-based organisation promoting the study of phonetics

- Abbreviation: IPA
- Formation: 1886; 140 years ago
- Founder: Paul Passy
- Type: Private company limited by guarantee
- Purpose: Scientific study of phonetics
- Headquarters: 24 Holborn Viaduct, London, England
- Official language: None by law English de facto
- President: Katerina Nicolaidis
- Key people: Daniel Jones; Peter Ladefoged
- Main organ: Journal of the International Phonetic Association
- Website: International Phonetic Association

The International Phonetic Association (IPA; French: Association phonétique internationale [asɔsjɑsjɔ̃ fɔnetik ɛ̃tɛʁnɑsjɔnal], API) is an organization that promotes the scientific study of phonetics and the various practical applications of that science. The IPA's major contribution to phonetics is the International Phonetic Alphabet—a notational standard for the phonetic representation of all languages. The acronym IPA refers to both the association and the alphabet. On 30 June 2015, it was incorporated as a British private company limited by guarantee.

The IPA also oversees the Journal of the International Phonetic Association, published by Cambridge University Press, whose articles include descriptions of languages as well as other topics in phonetics. In addition, it arranges for the quadrennial International Congress of Phonetic Sciences (ICPhS) through its affiliate, the Permanent Council for the Organization of ICPhS.

== Early history ==
In 1886, a small group of language teachers in Paris formed an association to encourage the use of phonetic notation in schools to help children acquire realistic pronunciations of foreign languages and also to aid in teaching reading to young children. The group, led by Paul Passy, called itself initially Dhi Fonètik Tîtcerz' Asóciécon (the The Phonetic Teachers' Association). In January 1889, the name of the Association was changed to L'Association Phonétique des Professeurs de Langues Vivantes (AP), and, in 1897, to L'Association Phonétique Internationale (API)—in English, the International Phonetic Association (IPA). The IPA's early peak of membership and influence in education circles was around 1914, when there were 1751 members in 40 countries. World War I and its aftermath severely disrupted the Association's activities, and the Journal did not resume regular publication until 1922.

== Development of the Alphabet ==
The group's initial aim was to create a set of phonetic symbols to which different articulations could apply, such that each language would have an alphabet particularly suited to describe the sounds of the language. Eventually it was decided that a universal alphabet, with the same symbol being used for the same sound in different languages was the ideal. The first prototype of the International Phonetic Alphabet appeared in Phonetic Teachers' Association (1888), and its development progressed rapidly up to the turn of the 20th century. Since then, there have been several sets of changes to the Alphabet, with additions and deletions that the progress of the science of phonetics has indicated.

== Examinations ==
The IPA also gave examinations in phonetics, starting 1908, awarding Certificates of Proficiency in the phonetics of English, French, or German. In 2023, due to dwindling intake, the examination was formally discontinued.

== See also ==
- List of phonetics topics
- Language reform

Place →	Labial					Coronal										Dorsal					Laryngeal			
Manner ↓	Bilabial		Labiodental		Linguolabial		Dental		Alveolar		Postalveolar		Retroflex		(Alveolo-)palatal		Velar		Uvular		Pharyngeal/epiglottal		Glottal	
Nasal	m̥	m	ɱ̊	ɱ		n̼	n̪̊	n̪	n̥	n	n̠̊	n̠	ɳ̊	ɳ	ɲ̊	ɲ	ŋ̊	ŋ	ɴ̥	ɴ				
Plosive	p	b	p̪	b̪	t̼	d̼	t̪	d̪	t	d			ʈ	ɖ	c	ɟ	k	ɡ	q	ɢ	ʡ		ʔ	
Sibilant affricate							t̪s̪	d̪z̪	ts	dz	t̠ʃ	d̠ʒ	tʂ	dʐ	tɕ	dʑ								
Non-sibilant affricate	pɸ	bβ	p̪f	b̪v			t̪θ	d̪ð	tɹ̝̊	dɹ̝	t̠ɹ̠̊˔	d̠ɹ̠˔			cç	ɟʝ	kx	ɡɣ	qχ	ɢʁ	ʡʜ	ʡʢ	ʔh	
Sibilant fricative							s̪	z̪	s	z	ʃ	ʒ	ʂ	ʐ	ɕ	ʑ								
Non-sibilant fricative	ɸ	β	f	v	θ̼	ð̼	θ	ð	θ̠	ð̠	ɹ̠̊˔	ɹ̠˔	ɻ̊˔	ɻ˔	ç	ʝ	x	ɣ	χ	ʁ	ħ	ʕ	h	ɦ
Approximant		β̞		ʋ				ð̞		ɹ		ɹ̠		ɻ		j		ɰ						˷
Tap/flap		ⱱ̟		ⱱ					ɾ̥	ɾ			ɽ̊	ɽ						ɢ̆		ʡ̮		
Trill	ʙ̥	ʙ							r̥	r		r̠	ɽ̊r̥	ɽr					ʀ̥	ʀ	ʜ	ʢ		
Lateral affricate									tɬ	dɮ			tꞎ	d𝼅	c𝼆	ɟʎ̝	k𝼄	ɡʟ̝						
Lateral fricative							ɬ̪		ɬ	ɮ			ꞎ	𝼅	𝼆	ʎ̝	𝼄	ʟ̝						
Lateral approximant								l̪	l̥	l		l̠	ɭ̊	ɭ	ʎ̥	ʎ	ʟ̥	ʟ		ʟ̠				
Lateral tap/flap									ɺ̥	ɺ			𝼈̊	𝼈		ʎ̮		ʟ̆						

		BL	LD	D	A	PA	RF	P	V	U
Implosive	Voiced	ɓ			ɗ		ᶑ	ʄ	ɠ	ʛ
Implosive	Voiceless	ɓ̥			ɗ̥		ᶑ̊	ʄ̊	ɠ̊	ʛ̥
Ejective	Stop	pʼ			tʼ		ʈʼ	cʼ	kʼ	qʼ
Ejective	Affricate		p̪fʼ	t̪θʼ	tsʼ	t̠ʃʼ	tʂʼ	tɕʼ	kxʼ	qχʼ
Ejective	Fricative	ɸʼ	fʼ	θʼ	sʼ	ʃʼ	ʂʼ	ɕʼ	xʼ	χʼ
Ejective	Lateral affricate				tɬʼ			c𝼆ʼ	k𝼄ʼ	q𝼄ʼ
Ejective	Lateral fricative				ɬʼ					
Click (top: velar; bottom: uvular)	Tenuis	kʘ qʘ		kǀ qǀ	kǃ qǃ		k𝼊 q𝼊	kǂ qǂ		
Click (top: velar; bottom: uvular)	Voiced	ɡʘ ɢʘ		ɡǀ ɢǀ	ɡǃ ɢǃ		ɡ𝼊 ɢ𝼊	ɡǂ ɢǂ		
Click (top: velar; bottom: uvular)	Nasal	ŋʘ ɴʘ		ŋǀ ɴǀ	ŋǃ ɴǃ		ŋ𝼊 ɴ𝼊	ŋǂ ɴǂ	ʞ	
Click (top: velar; bottom: uvular)	Tenuis lateral				kǁ qǁ					
Click (top: velar; bottom: uvular)	Voiced lateral				ɡǁ ɢǁ					
Click (top: velar; bottom: uvular)	Nasal lateral				ŋǁ ɴǁ					
