= Antoine François Passy =

French politician, geologist and botanist

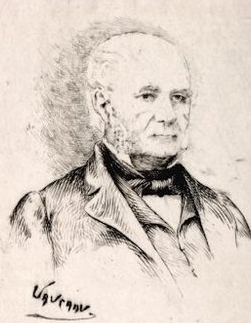

Antoine François Passy (23 April 1792, in Garches – 8 October 1873) was a French politician, geologist, and botanist. He was sub-secretary of state for the Interior in the Cabinet of François-Pierre Guizot (19 September 1847 to 24 February 1848).
