= Antoine Cartier d'Aure =

French riding-master

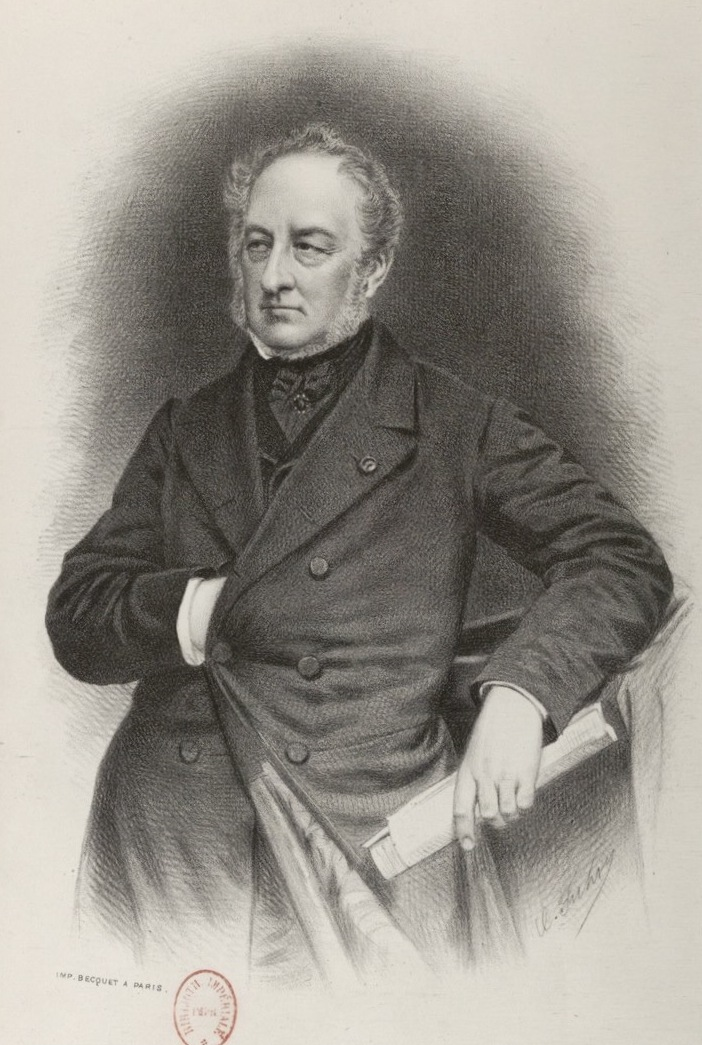
- Portrait from the Traité d'équitation, fourth edition, 1870
- Born: Antoine-Henri-Philippe-Léon Cartier; 2 June 1799 = 15 Prairial VII; Toulouse, Haute-Garonne
- Died: 6 April 1863; Saint-Cloud, Hauts-de-Seine
- Other names: Comte d'Aure; Vicomte d'Aure
- Occupation: riding-master

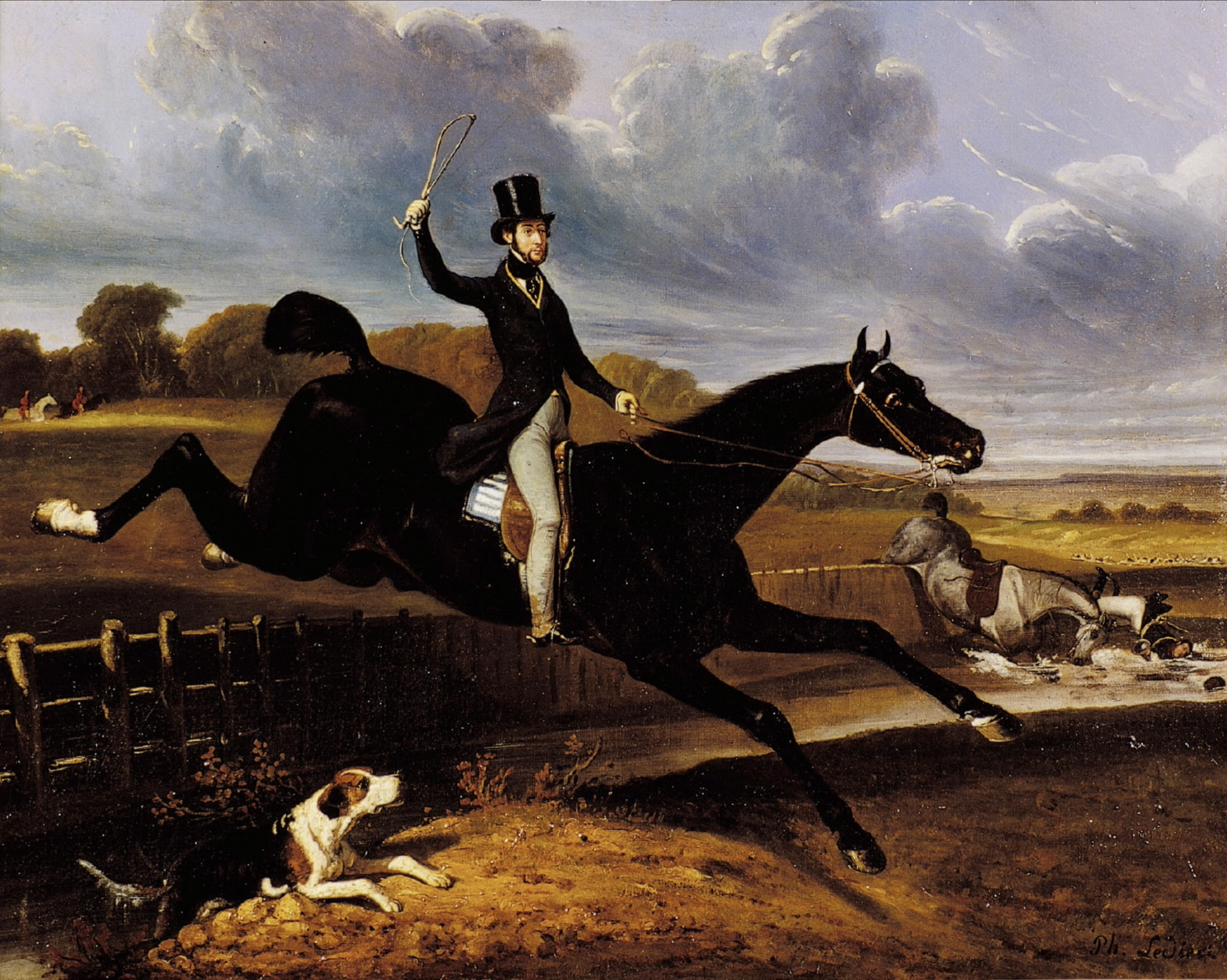
Equestrian portrait by Philippe Ledieu, circa 1834, in the Château-Musée de Saumur

Viscount Antoine Henri Philippe Léon Cartier d'Aure (2 June 1799 – 6 April 1863) was a French riding-master, and author of important treatises on dressage. He was écuyer en chef of the Cadre Noir of Saumur, and later to the Emperor of France, Napoleon III. He was made an officer of the Légion d'Honneur in 1849.

== Life ==
Cartier d'Aure was born on 2 June 1799 (15 Prairial VII according to the Republican calendar then in use) in Toulouse, in the Haute-Garonne in south-west France, the posthumous son of Antoine Cartier d'Aure of Pointis-de-Rivière and Rose-Claire Barthélémie de Foucaud, who was from the Languedoc. In 1815 he left the academy of Saint-Cyr with the rank of sous-lieutenant. He was sent to the École de Versailles to learn to ride, and trained under Pierre-Marie d'Abzac; he was made an écuyer in 1821. Under Louis XVIII and Charles X he was an écuyer cavalcadour. In 1823, after service in Spain, he was made a knight of the Légion d'Honneur.

From 26 February 1847 he was écuyer en chef of the Saumur Cavalry School. In 1849 he was promoted to officer of the Légion d'Honneur. He retired on 17 July 1854, and went to live at Tours.

In 1858 he was appointed écuyer en chef and inspector of the imperial stables to the Emperor of France, Napoleon III. From 1861 he was inspector-general of the imperial stud.

He died on 6 April 1863 at the Château de Saint-Cloud in Saint-Cloud, Hauts-de-Seine. He had married three times, to Clémence-Etienette Le Noir de Pas de Loup, to Louise Ursule Chapelles de Courteilles, and lastly to Adrienne-Olympe de Bentzon, who survived him.

== Published works ==
The published works of Cartier d'Aure include but probably are not limited to the following:

- Aperçu sur la situation des chevaux en France, par M. le Vte d'Aure,... 1826
- Projet relatif aux chevaux et aux écoles d'équitation, par le Vte d'Aure 1828
- Bourrienne et ses erreurs volontaires ou involontaires (2 volumes, in-12°) 1830
- Traité d'équitation, par M. le Vte d'Aure... Paris: Mme Leclère, 1834
- Situation chevaline de la France, par le Vte d'Aure 1835
- De l'Amélioration du cheval en France 1836
- De l'industrie chevaline en France et des moyens pratiques d'en assurer la prospérité Paris: Chez Léautey et Lecointe 1840
- Observations sur la nouvelle méthode d'équitation, par M. le Vte d'Aure 1842
- Quelques Observations sur la brochure du Mis Oudinot (″Des Remontes, de leurs rapports avec l'administration des haras″), par M. le Vte d'Aure 1842
- Réponse de M. le vicomte d'Aure a un article du Spectateur militaire du 15 janvier 1843 (signé Guillaume-Auguste D.) en faveur de la nouvelle méthode d'équitation. [Paris, Imprimerie de Ve Dondey-Dupré, 1843]
- Utilité d'une école normale d'équitation, de son influence sur l'éducation du cheval léger, sur les besoins de l'agriculture et sur les ressources qu'elle peut offrir à la classe pauvre, par M. le Vte d'Aure 1845
- Traité d'équitation illustré: précédé d'un aperçu des diverses modifications et changements apportés dans l'équitation depuis le XVIe siècle jusqu'à nos jours ... Paris: A. Leneveu, 1847. "Illustrated treatise of equitation ..." (the 3rd edition, according to Brunet)
- Des haras et de la situation chevaline en 1852 Saumur: [s.n.] 1852, "Of stud-farms and the situation of the horse in 1852"
- Cours d'équitation Paris: J. Dumaine 1853
- De la Question équestre et de Madame Isabelle à l'École de cavalerie, par le Cte d'Aure 1855
- Encore la question chevaline Paris: Dumaine 1860
