= History of the International Phonetic Alphabet =

The latest chart of the International Phonetic Alphabet, revised to 2020

The International Phonetic Alphabet was created soon after the International Phonetic Association was established in the late 19th century. It was intended as an international system of phonetic transcription for oral languages, originally for pedagogical purposes. The Association was established in Paris in 1886 by French and British language teachers led by Paul Passy. The prototype of the alphabet appeared in Phonetic Teachers' Association (1888b). The Association based their alphabet upon the Romic alphabet of Henry Sweet, which in turn was based on the Phonotypic Alphabet of Isaac Pitman and the Palæotype of Alexander John Ellis.

The alphabet has undergone a number of revisions during its history, the most significant being the one put forth at the Kiel Convention in 1989. Changes to the alphabet are proposed and discussed in the Association's organ, Journal of the International Phonetic Association, previously known as Le Maître Phonétique and before that as The Phonetic Teacher, and then put to a vote by the Association's Council.

The extensions to the IPA for disordered speech were created in 1990, with a major revision in 2015.

== Early alphabets ==
The International Phonetic Association was founded in Paris in 1886 under the name Dhi Fonètik Tîtcerz' Asóciécon (The Phonetic Teachers' Association), a development of L'Association phonétique des professeurs d'Anglais ("The English Teachers' Phonetic Association"), to promote an international phonetic alphabet, designed primarily for English, French, and German, for use in schools to facilitate acquiring foreign pronunciation.

Originally the letters had different phonetic values from language to language. For example, English [ʃ] was transcribed with ⟨c⟩ and French [ʃ] with ⟨x⟩.

As of May and November 1887, the alphabets were as follows:

Early alphabets of the Phonetic Teachers' Association

English
Letter		Example	Modern equivalent
May	Nov.	Example	Modern equivalent
k		—N/a	k
g		—N/a	ɡ
t		—N/a	t
d		—N/a	d
p		—N/a	p
b		—N/a	b
h		—N/a	h
y		—N/a	j
s		—N/a	s
z		—N/a	z
c		she	ʃ
j		measure	ʒ
r		—N/a	r
th	θ	thin	θ
dh	ð	then	ð
f		—N/a	f
v		—N/a	v
hw		what	ʍ
w		—N/a	w
l		—N/a	l
ɴ		sing	ŋ
n		—N/a	n
m		—N/a	m
i		pity	ɪ
î		peat	iː
e	—N/a	met	e
—N/a	e	met, learn	e
ei		mate	eɪ
a		man	æ
æ		air	ɛ
ᴀ		ask	ɑ
œ (Note: ⟨œ⟩ for English is omitted in the key but nonetheless seen in transcriptions in the May 1887 article.)		but, burn	ʌ
o		not	ɒ
ô		all	ɔː
ɔ		more, fellow	ɔ
ɔu		note	oʊ
u		pull	ʊ
û		pool	uː
ə		rival	ə
ai		ride	aɪ
au		how	aʊ
oi		oil	ɔɪ

French
Letter		Example	Modern equivalent
May	Nov.	Example	Modern equivalent
k	q	—N/a	k
g		—N/a	ɡ
t		—N/a	t
d		—N/a	d
p		—N/a	p
b		—N/a	b
h		—N/a	h
j	y	yak	j
s		—N/a	s
z		—N/a	z
x	c	chat	ʃ
ᴊ	j	je	ʒ
f		—N/a	f
v		—N/a	v
y	ᴜ	huile	ɥ
w		oui	w
r		—N/a	ʁ
l		—N/a	l
ɴ		règne	ɲ
n		—N/a	n
m		—N/a	m
u	ɯ	tout	u
o		pot	o
ɔ		note	ɔ
ᴀ		tas	ɑ
a		rat	a
æ		très	ɛ
e		nez	e
i		lit	i
œ		cœur	œ
ö	ɶ	peu	ø
ü	u	nu	y
—N/a	ᴇ	méchant	e
ə		je	ə
ô		ton	ɔ̃
â		tant	ɑ̃
ê		teint	ɛ̃
û	œ̃	un	œ̃
.		—N/a	:

German
Letter		Example	Modern equivalent
May	Nov.	Example	Modern equivalent
k		—N/a	k
g		—N/a	ɡ
t		—N/a	t
d		—N/a	d
p		—N/a	p
b		—N/a	b
h		—N/a	h
c	x	ach	x
ɢ		wagen	ɣ
ç		ich	ç
j		—N/a	j
s		—N/a	s
z		so	z
x	c	Tisch	ʃ
ᴊ	ʒ	Genie	ʒ
f		—N/a	f
v		wer	v
w		zwei	ʋ
r		—N/a	ʁ
l		—N/a	l
ɴ		—N/a	ŋ
n		—N/a	n
m		—N/a	m
û		du	uː
u		Nuss	ʊ
ô		so	oː
o		soll	ɔ
a		kann	a
â	ᴀ	Kahn	aː
æ		Bär	ɛː
e		nett	ɛ
ê		See	eː
i		mit	ɪ
î		viel	iː
œ		können	œ
ö	ɶ	Söhne	øː
y		dünn	ʏ
ü		kühn	yː
ə		Gabe	ə
'		—N/a	ʔ

== 1888 alphabet ==
In the August–September 1888 issue of its journal, the Phonetic Teachers' Association published a standardized alphabet intended for transcription of multiple languages, reflecting its members' consensus that only one set of alphabet ought to be used for all languages, along with a set of six principles:

1. There should be a separate sign for each distinctive sound; that is, for each sound which, being used instead of another, in the same language, can change the meaning of a word.
2. When any sound is found in several languages, the same sign should be used in all. This applies also to very similar shades of sound.
3. The alphabet should consist as much as possible of the ordinary letters of the roman alphabet; as few new letters as possible being used.
4. In assigning values to the roman letters, international usage should decide.
5. The new letters should be suggestive of the sounds they represent, by their resemblance to the old ones.
6. Diacritic marks should be avoided, being trying for the eyes and troublesome to write.

The principles would govern all future development of the alphabet, with the exception of #5 and in some cases #2, until they were revised drastically in 1989. #6 has also been loosened, as diacritics have been admitted for limited purposes.

The devised alphabet was as follows. The letters marked with an asterisk were "provisional shapes", which were meant to be replaced "when circumstances will allow".

Shape		Value			
Shape		English	French	German	Other languages
p	as in	put	pas	pferd	
b	as in	but	bas	boot	
t	as in	ten	tant	tot	
d	as in	den	dent	da	
k	as in	kind	képi	kuh	
g	as in	good	gai	gut	
m	as in	my	ma	mein	
n	as in	no	non	nein	
ɴ	as in		règne		Ital. regno
*ɴ	as in	thing		ding	Ital. anche
l	as in	lull	la	lang	
*ʎ	as in		fille (in the south)		Sp. llano, Ital. gli
r	as in	red	rare	rot	(tongue-point r)
ʀ	as in		rare	rot	(back r). – Dan. træ
ᴜ	as in			quer	Flem. wrocht, Span. bibir.
ɥ	as in		buis		
w	as in	wel	oui		Ital. questo
f	as in	full	fou	voll	
v	as in	vain	vin	wein	
θ	as in	thin			Span. razon
ð	as in	then			Dan. gade
s	as in	seal	sel	weiss	
z	as in	zeal	zèle	weise	
*c	as in	she	chat	fisch	Swed. skæl, Dan. sjæl, Ital. lascia
ʒ	as in	leisure	jeu	genie	
ç	as in			ich	
j	as in	you	yak	ja	Swed. ja, Ital. jena
x	as in			ach	Span. jota
q	as in			wagen	
h	as in	high	(haut)	hoch	
u	as in	full	cou	nuss	
o	as in	soul	pot	soll	
ɔ	as in	not	note		Ital. notte
ᴀ	as in		pas	vater	Swed. sal
*a	as in	father			Ital. mano, Swed. mann.
a	as in	eye, how	patte	mann	
æ	as in	man			
ɛ	as in	air	air	bær	
e	as in	men	né	nett	
i	as in	pit	ni	mit	
*œ	as in	but, fur			
œ	as in		seul	kœnnen	
*ɶ	as in		peu	sœhne	
y	as in		nu	dünn	
*ü	as in			für	
ə	as in	never	je	gabe	
ʼ		Glottal catch			
˗u, u˗		Weak stressed u			These modifications apply to all letters
·u, u·, u̇		Strong stressed u			These modifications apply to all letters
u꞉		Long u			These modifications apply to all letters
œ̃		Nasal œ (or any other vowel)			
û		Long and narrow u (or any other vowel)			
hl, lh		Voiceless l (or any other consonant)			
꞉		Mark of length			

== 1899 Viëtor alphabet ==
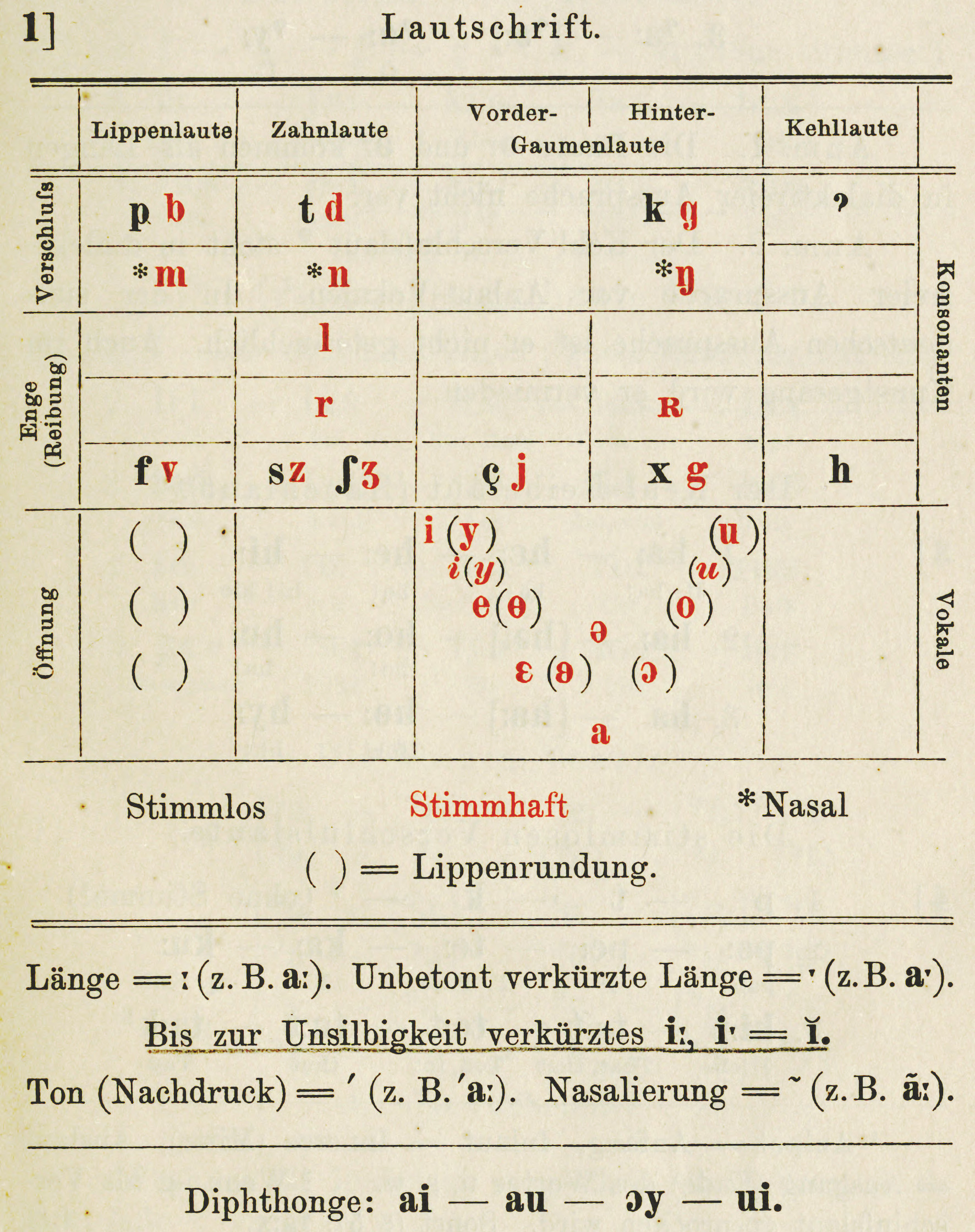
Table of phonetic symbols in Viëtor 1899. There had been requests to replace IPA ⟨ø⟩ and ⟨œ⟩ with more iconic ⟨ɵ⟩ and ⟨ʚ⟩ as in this table, primarily by English-speakers, as early as 1900. These were recognized as alternative symbols in 1904 and 1909 and were used as such in the early 20th century, but were only officially adopted in 1921 as the corresponding central vowels. Note also ⟨ɡ⟩ for its modern value and ⟨g⟩ for modern [ɣ].

Although not published by the PTA/IPA, the (possibly mutual) influence of the Viëtor alphabet of 1899 on the development of the IPA alphabet is clear.

	Lippenlaute	Zahnlaute	Vorder-	Hinter-	Kehllaute	
	Lippenlaute	Zahnlaute	Gaumenlaute		Kehllaute	
Verschluss	p b	t d		k ɡ	ʔ	Konsonanten
Verschluss	m	n		ŋ		Konsonanten
Enge (Reibung)		l				Konsonanten
Enge (Reibung)		r		ʀ		Konsonanten
Enge (Reibung)	f v	s z ʃ ʒ	ç j	x g	h	Konsonanten
Öffnung			i (y) (u) 𝑖 (𝑦) (𝑢) e (ɵ) (o) ə ɛ (ʚ) (ɔ) a			Vokale

The triangular colons for length were already in use:

Long: aː, half-long: aˑ, non-syllabic: ă, stressed: ʹa, nasal: ã.

== 1900 IPA chart ==
During the 1890s, the alphabet was expanded to cover sounds of Arabic and other non-European languages which did not easily fit the Latin alphabet.

Throughout the first half of the 1900s, the Association published a series of booklets outlining the specifications of the alphabet in several languages, the first being a French edition published in 1900. In the book, the chart appeared as follows:

		Laryn- gales	Guttu- rales	Uvu- laires	Vélaires	Palatales	Linguales	Labiales
Consonnes	Plosives	ʔ		q ɢ	k ɡ	c ɟ	t d	p b
Consonnes	Nasales				ŋ	ɲ	n	m
Consonnes	Latérales				ɫ	ʎ	l	
Consonnes	Roulées		ꞯ	ᴙ ʀ			r	
Consonnes	Fricatives	h	ʜ ɦ	ᴚ ʁ	(ʍ w) x ǥ (Note: To be precise, the shape of ⟨ǥ⟩ is close to ⟨⟩ in the 1900, 1904, and 1912 charts, and to ⟨⟩ in the 1921 chart and Jones (1928).)	(ɥ) ç j	ɹ, θ ð, ʃ ʒ, s z ᵷ ʒ	f v ꜰ ʋ ʍ w ɥ
Voyelles	Fermées				uɯüïyi ᴜ ʏɪ (Note: Although this is a small-cap i ⟨ɪ⟩ in all productions of the chart which include it, in the journal publications it's clearly in variation with a dotless i ⟨ı⟩ until 1912. See Viëtor (1901) for example, which uses both.) oᴀöëøe ə ɔʌɔ̈äœɛ ɐæ ɑa			(u ü y) (o ö ø) (ɔ ɔ̈ œ)
Voyelles	Mi-fermées				uɯüïyi ᴜ ʏɪ oᴀöëøe ə ɔʌɔ̈äœɛ ɐæ ɑa			(u ü y) (o ö ø) (ɔ ɔ̈ œ)
Voyelles	Moyennes				uɯüïyi ᴜ ʏɪ oᴀöëøe ə ɔʌɔ̈äœɛ ɐæ ɑa			(u ü y) (o ö ø) (ɔ ɔ̈ œ)
Voyelles	Mi-ouvertes				uɯüïyi ᴜ ʏɪ oᴀöëøe ə ɔʌɔ̈äœɛ ɐæ ɑa			(u ü y) (o ö ø) (ɔ ɔ̈ œ)
Voyelles	Ouvertes				uɯüïyi ᴜ ʏɪ oᴀöëøe ə ɔʌɔ̈äœɛ ɐæ ɑa			(u ü y) (o ö ø) (ɔ ɔ̈ œ)

Initially, the charts were arranged with laryngeal sounds on the left and labial ones on the right, following the convention of Alexander Melville Bell's Visible Speech. Vowels and consonants were placed in a single chart, reflecting how sounds ranged in openness from stops (top) to open vowels (bottom). The voiced velar fricative was represented by ⟨⟩ (distinct from ⟨ɡ⟩, which represents a plosive) since 1895 until it was replaced by ⟨ǥ⟩ in 1900. ⟨ǥ⟩ too would be replaced by ⟨ɣ⟩ in 1931.

Not all letters, especially those in the fricatives row which included both fricatives in the modern sense and approximants, were self-explanatory and could only be discerned in the notes following the chart, which redefined letters using the orthographies of languages wherein the sounds they represent occur. For example:

(ꞯ) [is] the Arabic ain [modern ⟨ʕ⟩]. (ꜰ) (ʋ) is a simple bilabial fricative [modern ⟨ɸ β⟩] ... (θ) is the English hard th, Spanish z, Romaic [Greek] θ, Icelandic þ; (ð) the English soft th, Icelandic ð, Romaic δ. (ɹ) is the non-rolled r of Southern British, and can also be used for the simple r of Spanish and Portuguese [modern ⟨ɾ⟩] ... (x) is found in German in ach; (ǥ), in wagen, as often pronounced in the north of Germany [modern ⟨ɣ⟩]. (ᴚ) is the Arabic kh as in khalifa [modern ⟨χ⟩]; (ʁ) the Danish r; the Parisian r is intermediate between (ʀ) and (ʁ). — (ʜ) [modern ⟨ħ⟩] and (ɦ) are the ha and he in Arabic. — (ᵷ) and (ʒ) are sounds in Circassian [approximately modern ⟨ɕ ʑ⟩].

Nasalized vowels were marked with a tilde: ⟨ã⟩, ⟨ẽ⟩, etc. It was noted that ⟨ə⟩ may be used for "any vowel of obscure and intermediate quality found in weak syllables". A long sound was distinguished by trailing ⟨ː⟩. Stress may be marked by ⟨´⟩ before the stressed syllable, as necessary, and the Swedish and Norwegian 'compound tone' (double tone) with ⟨ˇ⟩ before the syllable.

Where distinct letters were not provided for both a voiced and voiceless phonation of an articulation, a voiced sound was marked by ⟨◌̬⟩ and a voiceless one by ⟨◌̥⟩. Retroflex consonants were marked by ⟨◌̣⟩, as in ⟨ṣ, ṭ, ṇ⟩. Arabic emphatic consonants were marked by ⟨◌̤⟩: ⟨s̤, t̤, d̤⟩. Consonants accompanied by a glottal stop (ejectives) were marked by ⟨ʼ⟩: ⟨kʼ, pʼ⟩. Tense and lax vowels (at the time referred to as "narrow" and "wide", respectively) were distinguished by acute and grave accents: feet [fíːt], fit [fìt]. Non-syllabic vowels were marked by a breve, as in ⟨ŭ⟩, and syllabic consonants by an acute below, as in ⟨n̗⟩. Following letters, spacing ⟨◌꭫⟩ stood for advanced tongue, ⟨◌꭪⟩ for retracted tongue, ⟨◌˕⟩ for more open mouth, ⟨◌˔⟩ for more closed mouth, ⟨◌˒⟩ for more rounded lips, and ⟨◌˓⟩ for more spread lips – for example the French schwa [ə꭪˒] (or perhaps [ə꭪₎]). It was also noted that a superscript letter may be used to indicate a tinge of that sound in the sound represented by the preceding letter, as in ⟨ʃᶜ̧⟩.

It was emphasized, however, that once such details are supplied in the phonetic description, they need not be repeated in transcription. The equivalent part of the 1904 English edition said:

[I]t must remain a general principle to leave out everything self-evident, and everything that can be explained once for all. This allows us to dispense almost completely with the modifiers, and with a good many other signs, except in scientific works and in introductory explanations. We write English fill and French fil the same way fil; yet the English vowel is 'wide' and the French 'narrow', and the English l is formed much further back than the French. If we wanted to mark these differences, we should write English fìl꭪, French fíl꭫. But we need not do so: we know, once for all, that English short i is always ì, and French i always í; that English l is always l꭪ and French l always l꭫.

== 1904 chart ==
In the 1904 Aim and Principles of the International Phonetic Association, the first of its kind in English, the chart appeared as:

		Bronchs	Throat	Uvula	Back	Front	Tongue-point	Lip
Consonants	Stopped		ˀ	q ɢ	k ɡ	c ɟ	t d	p b
Consonants	Nasal				ŋ	ɲ	n	m
Consonants	Side				ɫ	ʎ	l	
Consonants	Trilled			ᴙ ʀ			r	
Consonants	Squeezed	ʜ ꞯ	h ɦ	ᴚ ʁ	(ʍ w) x ǥ	(ɥ) ç j	ɹ, θ ð, ʃ ʒ, s z	f v ꜰ ʋ ʍ w ɥ
Vowels	Close				uɯüïyi ʊ ʏɪ oᴀöëøe ə ɔʌɔ̈äœɛ ɐæ ɑa			(u ü y) (ʊ ʏ) (o ö ø) (ɔ ɔ̈ œ)
Vowels	Half-close				uɯüïyi ʊ ʏɪ oᴀöëøe ə ɔʌɔ̈äœɛ ɐæ ɑa			(u ü y) (ʊ ʏ) (o ö ø) (ɔ ɔ̈ œ)
Vowels	Mid				uɯüïyi ʊ ʏɪ oᴀöëøe ə ɔʌɔ̈äœɛ ɐæ ɑa			(u ü y) (ʊ ʏ) (o ö ø) (ɔ ɔ̈ œ)
Vowels	Half-open				uɯüïyi ʊ ʏɪ oᴀöëøe ə ɔʌɔ̈äœɛ ɐæ ɑa			(u ü y) (ʊ ʏ) (o ö ø) (ɔ ɔ̈ œ)
Vowels	Open				uɯüïyi ʊ ʏɪ oᴀöëøe ə ɔʌɔ̈äœɛ ɐæ ɑa			(u ü y) (ʊ ʏ) (o ö ø) (ɔ ɔ̈ œ)

In comparison to the 1900 chart, the glottal stop ⟨ʔ⟩ appeared as a dotless question mark at a slightly smaller size in the chart or sample transcriptions, similar to the footless form for the modifier letter ⟨ˀ⟩, but as a full letter in the table showing script forms next to typographic forms. ⟨ʊ⟩ replaced ⟨ᴜ⟩. ⟨ᵷ⟩, ⟨ʒ⟩ were removed from the chart and instead only mentioned as having "been suggested for a Circassian dental hiss [sibilant] and its voiced correspondent". ⟨σ⟩ is suggested for the Bantu labialized sibilant, and ⟨*⟩ as a diacritic to mark click consonants. It was noted that "some" preferred iconic ⟨ɵ ʚ⟩ to ⟨ø œ⟩, and considered ⟨ɪ⟩ and ⟨ː⟩ to be unsatisfactory symbols.

Laryngeal consonants had also been moved around, reflecting little understanding about the mechanisms of laryngeal articulations at the time. ⟨ʜ⟩ and ⟨ꞯ⟩ were defined as the Arabic ح and ع.

In the notes, the half-length mark ⟨ˑ⟩ is now mentioned, and it is noted that whispered sounds may be marked with a diacritical comma, as in ⟨u̦, i̦⟩. A syllabic consonant is now marked by a vertical bar, as in ⟨n̩⟩, rather than ⟨n̗⟩. It is noted, in this edition only, that "shifted vowels" with uncharacteristic rounding may be indicated: ⟨꭪꭪⟩ (on a back-vowel letter) for a protruded central or front vowel, and ⟨꭫꭫⟩ (on a front-vowel letter) for a compressed back vowel.

In the textual description, the Northern English rhotic vowels are transcribed with a combining letter ⟨ɹ⟩ above, such as in far [fː] (this is not supported by Unicode as of 2026), which would be replaced by spacing ⟨ʴ⟩ in the next edition.

== 1912 chart ==
Following 1904, sets of specifications in French appeared in 1905 and 1908, with little to no changes. In 1912, the second English booklet appeared. For the first time, labial sounds were shown on the left and laryngeal ones on the right:

		Lips	Lip-teeth	Point and Blade	Front	Back	Uvula	Throat
Consonants	Plosive	p b		t d	c ɟ	k ɡ	q ɢ	ˀ
Consonants	Nasal	m		n	ɲ	ŋ	ɴ	
Consonants	Lateral			l ɫ	ʎ	(ɫ)		
Consonants	Rolled			r ř			ʀ	
Consonants	Fricative	ꜰ ʋ ʍ w ɥ σ ƍ	f v	θ ð s z σ ƍ ʃ ʒ ɹ	ç j (ɥ)	(ʍ w) x ǥ	ᴚ ʁ	h ɦ
Vowels					Front Mixed Back			
Vowels	Close	(u ü y) (ʊ ʏ) (o ö ø) (ɔ ɔ̈ œ)			i yï üɯ u ɪ ʏʊ e øë öᴀ o ə ɛ œɛ̈ ɔ̈ʌ ɔ æɐ aɑ			
Vowels	Half-close	(u ü y) (ʊ ʏ) (o ö ø) (ɔ ɔ̈ œ)			i yï üɯ u ɪ ʏʊ e øë öᴀ o ə ɛ œɛ̈ ɔ̈ʌ ɔ æɐ aɑ			
Vowels	Half-open	(u ü y) (ʊ ʏ) (o ö ø) (ɔ ɔ̈ œ)			i yï üɯ u ɪ ʏʊ e øë öᴀ o ə ɛ œɛ̈ ɔ̈ʌ ɔ æɐ aɑ			
Vowels	Open	(u ü y) (ʊ ʏ) (o ö ø) (ɔ ɔ̈ œ)			i yï üɯ u ɪ ʏʊ e øë öᴀ o ə ɛ œɛ̈ ɔ̈ʌ ɔ æɐ aɑ			

⟨ř⟩ was added for the Czech fricative trill and ⟨ɛ̈⟩ replaced ⟨ä⟩, following their approval in 1909. Though not included in the chart, ⟨ɱ⟩ was mentioned as an optional letter for the labiodental nasal. ⟨ɹ⟩ was still designated as the "provisional" letter for the alveolar tap/flap. ⟨σ, ƍ⟩ were defined as the Bantu sounds with "tongue position of θ, ð, combined with strong lip-rounding". ⟨ʜ, ꞯ⟩ were still included though not in the chart. ⟨ᴙ⟩ was removed entirely.

For the first time, affricates, or "'assibilated' consonant groups, i. e. groups in which the two elements are so closely connected that the whole might be treated as a single sound", were noted as able to be represented with a tie bar, as in ⟨t͡ʃ, d͜z⟩. Palatalized consonants could be marked by a dot above the letter, as in ⟨ṡ, ṅ, ṙ⟩, "suggesting the connexion with the sounds i and j".

⟨꭫, ꭪⟩ were no longer mentioned.

Although not mentioned on the chart, the asterisk had been used to mark proper names (primarily countries) in Le Maître Phonétique since 1907, and displacement of diacritics above letters with descenders was shown in the same year.

== 1921 booklet and chart ==
The 1921 Écriture phonétique internationale introduced new letters, some of which were never to be seen in any other booklet:

		Laryn- gales	Uvu- laires	Vélaires	Palatales	Linguales	Labiales
Consonnes	Plosives	ˀ	q ɢ	k ɡ	c ɟ	t d	p b
Consonnes	Nasales		ɴ	ŋ	ɲ	n	m
Consonnes	Latérales				ʎ	l	
Consonnes	Roulées		ᴙ ʀ			r	
Consonnes	Fricatives	h	χ ʁ	(ƕ w) x ǥ	( ɥ)ç j	ʃ ʒ s z ɹ θ ð	f v ꜰ ʋ ƕ w ɥ
Voyelles	Fermées			u ɯʉ ɨy i o ɤɵ ɘø e ə ɔ ʌʚ ᴈœ ɛ ɐ ɑa			(u ʉ y) (o ɵ ø) (ɔ ʚ œ)
Voyelles	Mi-fermées			u ɯʉ ɨy i o ɤɵ ɘø e ə ɔ ʌʚ ᴈœ ɛ ɐ ɑa			(u ʉ y) (o ɵ ø) (ɔ ʚ œ)
Voyelles	Mi-ouvertes			u ɯʉ ɨy i o ɤɵ ɘø e ə ɔ ʌʚ ᴈœ ɛ ɐ ɑa			(u ʉ y) (o ɵ ø) (ɔ ʚ œ)
Voyelles	Ouvertes			u ɯʉ ɨy i o ɤɵ ɘø e ə ɔ ʌʚ ᴈœ ɛ ɐ ɑa			(u ʉ y) (o ɵ ø) (ɔ ʚ œ)

⟨χ⟩ replaced ⟨ᴚ⟩ and ⟨ɤ⟩ replaced ⟨ᴀ⟩, both of which would not officially be approved until 1928. ⟨ƕ⟩ replaced ⟨ʍ⟩ and ⟨⟩ was added for a devoiced [ɥ], but neither has appeared in any other IPA chart and the latter is not supported by Unicode. Also added were dedicated letters for the central vowels, ⟨ɨ, ʉ, ɘ, ɵ, ᴈ, ʚ⟩, which appeared again in Trofimov & Jones (1923), p. 40 and in the chart in Le Maître Phonétique from 1926 to 1927, though without the Council's approval. Of these, only ⟨ɨ, ʉ, ᴈ, ɵ⟩ were approved in the 1928 revision, with a different value for ⟨ᴈ⟩, until ⟨ɘ, ʚ⟩ were revived and ⟨ᴈ⟩ regained the 1921 value in 1993. The old convention of ⟨ï, ü, ë, ö, ɛ̈, ɔ̈⟩ was retained for where central vowels were not phonemically distinct. ⟨ə, ɐ⟩ were still for obscure or indeterminate vowels, as opposed to the others, which would indicate clear pronunciations.

The book also mentioned letters "already commonly used in special works", some of which had long been part of the IPA but others which "have not yet been definitively adopted":

- ⟨ɾ⟩ for a single-tap r
- ⟨ř⟩ for the Czech fricative trill
- ⟨ɦ⟩ for a voiced [h]
- ⟨ħ, ʕ⟩ for the Arabic ح and ع, "whose formation we do not yet agree on"
- ⟨σ, ƍ⟩ (dental) and ⟨ƪ, ƺ⟩ (alveolar or palatal) for labialized sibilants found in South African languages
- As "suggested":
  - ⟨ᵷ, ʒ⟩ for Circassian dental fricatives
  - ⟨ɮ⟩ for fricative [l] of Bantu languages
  - ⟨ɺ⟩ for a sound between [r] and [l] found in African languages and in Japanese
- Small j for palatalized consonants: ⟨ƫ, ᶎ⟩
- Overlaying tilde for velarized and Arabic emphatic consonants: ⟨ᵵ, ᵭ⟩
- ⟨ɕ, ʑ⟩ for "dentalized palatals"
- ⟨𝼪, 𝼥, r⟩, etc. for retroflex consonants, previously represented by ⟨ṭ, ḍ, ṛ⟩ etc.
- ⟨ʦ, ʣ, ʧ, ʤ⟩, etc. for affricates
- ⟨ᴜ, ɪ, ʏ⟩ for the near-close equivalents of [o, e, ø]
- ⟨ɒ, æ⟩ for the near-open vowels in English not, man
- ⟨ʇ, ʖ, ʞ, ʗ⟩ for clicks, with ⟨ʞ⟩ for the common palatal click (this would be called "velar" in later editions of the IPA, following Jones' terminology)

It also introduced several new suprasegmental specifications:

- ⟨ˎ⟩ for "half-accent"
- ⟨˝⟩ for "reinforced accent"
- Tones could be indicated either before the syllable or on the nuclear vowel: ⟨ˊ◌, ◌́⟩ high rising, ⟨ˉ◌, ◌̄⟩ high level, ⟨ˋ◌, ◌̀⟩ high falling, ⟨ˏ◌, ◌̗⟩ low rising, ⟨ˍ◌, ◌̠⟩ low level, ⟨ˎ◌, ◌̖⟩ low falling, ⟨ˆ◌, ◌̂⟩ rise-fall, ⟨ˇ◌, ◌̌⟩ fall-rise
- Medium tones, as necessary: ⟨´◌⟩ mid rising, ⟨ˉ◌⟩ mid level, ⟨˴◌⟩ mid falling

It recommended the use of a circumflex for the Swedish grave accent, as in [ˆandən] ("the spirit"). It was mentioned that some authors prefer ⟨˖, ˗⟩ in place of ⟨꭫, ꭪⟩. Aspiration was marked as ⟨pʻ, tʻ, kʻ⟩ and stronger aspiration as ⟨ph, th, kh⟩.

The click letters ⟨ʇ, ʖ, ʞ, ʗ⟩ were conceived by Daniel Jones. In 1960, A. C. Gimson wrote to a colleague:

Paul Passy recognized the need for letters for the various clicks in the July–August 1914 number of Le Maître Phonétique and asked for suggestions. This number, however, was the last for some years because of the war. During this interval, Professor Daniel Jones himself invented the four letters, in consultation with Paul Passy and they were all four printed in the pamphlet L'Écriture Phonétique Internationale published in 1921. The letters were thus introduced in a somewhat unusual way, without the explicit consent of the whole Council of the Association. They were, however, generally accepted from then on, and, as you say, were used by Professor Doke in 1923. I have consulted Professor Jones in this matter, and he accepts responsibility for their invention, during the period of the First World War.

⟨ʇ, ʖ, ʗ⟩ would be approved by the Council in 1928. ⟨ʞ⟩ would be included in all subsequent booklets, but not in the single-page charts. They would be replaced with the Lepsius/Bleek letters in the 1989 Kiel revision.

The 1921 book was the first in the series to mention the word phoneme (phonème).

== 1925 Copenhagen Conference and 1927 revision ==
In April 1925, 12 linguists led by Otto Jespersen, including IPA Secretary Daniel Jones, attended a conference in Copenhagen and proposed specifications for a standardized system of phonetic notation. The proposals were largely dismissed by the members of the IPA Council. Nonetheless, the following additions recommended by the Conference were approved in 1927:

- ⟨ˑ⟩ could now indicate full length when there is no need to distinguish half and full length.
- Straight ⟨ˈ⟩ for stress instead of the previous slanted ⟨´⟩, and ⟨ˌ⟩ for secondary stress.
- ⟨◌̫⟩ (recalling a w) for labialized and ⟨◌̪⟩ (recalling a tooth) for dental.
- ⟨ʈ, ɖ, ɳ, ɭ, ɽ, ʂ, ʐ⟩, with the arm moved under the letter, for retroflex consonants.
- ⟨ɸ, β⟩ for bilabial fricatives, replacing ⟨ꜰ, ʋ⟩ (⟨ʋ⟩ was repurposed for the labiodental approximant).
- ⟨◌̣⟩ for more close and ⟨◌̜⟩ (Note: The left half under-ring for 'more open' was not confused with the left half ring for 'more spread' because the former was a combining diacritic under the letter and the latter a spacing diacritic after the letter: open [e̜] vs spread [e˓]. The 1925 conference had specifically rejected the ogonek (or ogonek-like) hook of the Romic tradition, because that would have been confused with the use of the ogonek for nasalization. A clear left half ring is seen in well-typeset publications of the time, the glyph was repeated in the 1949 Principles, and Pullum & Ladusaw (2013) [1996], p. 253 would later confirm it as such. However, various substitutions were used by printers, including a curled (Polish-style) —as in the 1938, 1947, 1951, 1979 IPA charts—, a straight (ypogegrammeni-like) ogonek – even occasionally in the IPA journal; a turned or reversed comma, as in the RFE Phonetic Alphabet; and a small less-than sign (a small ⟨◌͔⟩ – conversely, the 1925 conference had recommended a less-than diacritic for 'more close' (less open) and a small greater-than diacritic ⟨◌͕⟩ for 'more open'.)) for more open.

It was noted in response to an objection on the nasal diacritic being above the vowel that it could always be placed below (there being no under-tilde for creaky voice at the time).

== 1928 revision ==
In 1928, the following letters were adopted:

- ⟨ɬ, ɮ⟩ for lateral fricatives
- ⟨ᵭ⟩, ⟨ᵶ⟩, etc. for velarization or pharyngealization (by extension from ⟨ɫ⟩)
- ⟨ƫ⟩, ⟨ᶁ⟩, ⟨ᶇ⟩, etc. for palatalized consonants
- ⟨ɓ⟩, ⟨ɗ⟩, etc. for implosives

The following letters, which had appeared in earlier editions, were repeated or formalized:

- ⟨ɕ, ʑ⟩
- ⟨ƪ, ƺ⟩
- ⟨χ⟩
- ⟨ħ, ʕ⟩
- ⟨ɨ, ʉ, ɵ⟩
- ⟨ɤ⟩
- ⟨ᴈ⟩
- ⟨ɒ⟩
- ⟨ɺ⟩
- ⟨ʇ, ʖ, ʗ⟩

Jones (1928) also included ⟨ɱ⟩ for a labiodental nasal, ⟨ɾ⟩ for a dental or alveolar tap, ⟨ʞ⟩ for a palatal ('velar') click, and the tonal notation system seen in Association phonétique internationale (1921), p. 9. For the Swedish and Norwegian compound tones he recommended "any arbitrarily chosen mark", with the illustration [˟andən] ("the spirit"). He used ⟨ᴜ⟩ in place of ⟨ʊ⟩. Apart from ⟨ᴜ⟩ and ⟨ʞ⟩, these new specifications would be inherited in the subsequent charts and booklets. The diacritics for whispered, ⟨◌̦⟩, and for tense and lax, ⟨◌́, ◌̀⟩, were no longer mentioned.

== 1932 chart ==
An updated chart appeared as a supplement to Le Maître Phonétique in 1932.

		Bi-labial		Labio- dental	Dental and Alveolar			Retroflex	Palato- alveolar	Alveolo- palatal	Palatal	Velar	Uvular	Pharyngal	Glottal
Consonants	Plosive	p b			t d			ʈ ɖ			c ɟ	k ɡ	q ɢ		ʔ
Consonants	Nasal	m		ɱ	n			ɳ			ɲ	ŋ	ɴ		
Consonants	Lateral Fricative				ɬ ɮ										
Consonants	Lateral Non-fricative				l			ɭ			ʎ				
Consonants	Rolled				r								ʀ		
Consonants	Flapped				ɾ			ɽ					ʀ		
Consonants	Fricative	ɸ β		f v	θ ð	s z	ɹ	ʂ ʐ	ʃ ʒ	ɕ ʑ	ç j	x ɣ	χ ʁ	ħ ʕ	h ɦ
Consonants	Frictionless Continuants and Semi-vowels	w	ɥ	ʋ	ɹ						j (ɥ)	(w)	ʁ		
Vowels											Front Central Back				
Vowels	Close	(y ʉ u) (ø o) (œ ɔ) (ɒ)									i yɨ ʉɯ u e øɤ o ə ɛ œʌ ɔ æɐ aɑ ɒ				
Vowels	Half-close	(y ʉ u) (ø o) (œ ɔ) (ɒ)									i yɨ ʉɯ u e øɤ o ə ɛ œʌ ɔ æɐ aɑ ɒ				
Vowels	Half-open	(y ʉ u) (ø o) (œ ɔ) (ɒ)									i yɨ ʉɯ u e øɤ o ə ɛ œʌ ɔ æɐ aɑ ɒ				
Vowels	Open	(y ʉ u) (ø o) (œ ɔ) (ɒ)									i yɨ ʉɯ u e øɤ o ə ɛ œʌ ɔ æɐ aɑ ɒ				

The vowels were now arranged in a right-angled trapezium as opposed to an isosceles trapezium, reflecting Daniel Jones's development of the Cardinal Vowel theory. A practically identical chart—with the exception of ⟨ɣ⟩—in German had appeared in Jones (1928), p. 23. The substitution of ⟨ɣ⟩ for ⟨ǥ⟩ was approved in 1931.

The accompanying notes read:

Other Sounds.—Palatalized consonants: ƫ, ᶁ, etc. Velarized or pharyngealized consonants: ɫ, ᵭ, ᵴ, etc. Ejective consonants (plosives [sic] with simultaneous glottal stop): pʼ, tʼ, etc. Implosive voiced consonants: ɓ, ɗ, etc. ř fricative trill. σ, ƍ (labialized θ, ð, or s, z). ƪ, ƺ (labialized ʃ, ʒ). ʇ, ʗ, ʖ (clicks, Zulu c, q, x). ɺ (a sound between r and l). ʍ (voiceless w). ɪ, ʏ, ʊ (lowered varieties of i, y, u). ᴈ (a variety of ə). ɵ (a vowel between ø and o).

Affricates are normally represented by groups of two consonants (ts, tʃ, dʒ, etc.), but, when necessary, ligatures are used (ʦ, ʧ, ʤ, etc.), or the marks ͡ or ͜ (t͡s or t͜s, etc.). c, ɟ may occasionally be used in place of tʃ, dʒ. Aspirated plosives: ph, th, etc.

Length, Stress, Pitch.— ː (full length). ˑ (half length). ˈ (stress, placed at the beginning of the stressed syllable). ˌ (secondary stress). ˉ (high level pitch); ˍ (low level); ˊ (high rising); ˏ (low rising); ˋ (high falling); ˎ (low falling); ˆ (rise-fall); ˇ (fall-rise). See Écriture Phonétique Internationale, p. 9.

Modifiers.— ˜ nasality. ˳ breath (l̥ = breathed l). ˬ voice (s̬ = z). ʻ slight aspiration following p, t, etc. ̣ specially close vowel (ẹ = a very close e). ̜ specially open vowel (e̜ = a rather open e). ̫ labialization (n̫ = labialized n). ̪ dental articulation (t̪ = dental t). ˙ palatalization (ż = ᶎ). ˔ tongue slightly raised. ˕ tongue slightly lowered. ˒ lips more rounded. ˓ lips more spread. Central vowels ï (= ɨ), ü (= ʉ), ë (= ə˔), ö (= ɵ), ɛ̈, ɔ̈. ˌ (e.g. n̩) syllabic consonant. ˘ consonantal vowel. ʃˢ variety of ʃ resembling s, etc.

== 1937 revision and 1938 chart ==
A new chart appeared in 1938, with a few modifications. ⟨ɮ⟩ was replaced by ⟨ꜧ⟩, which was approved earlier in the year with the form ⟨⟩ approved as a compromise. The use of tie bars ⟨◌͡◌, ◌͜◌⟩ was allowed for synchronous articulation in addition to affricates, as in ⟨m͡ŋ⟩ for simultaneous [m] and [ŋ], which was approved in 1937. In the notes, the reference to Association phonétique internationale (1921), p. 9, in regard to tonal notation was removed.

== 1947 chart and 1948 revision ==
A new chart appeared in 1947, reflecting minor developments up to the point. They were:

- ⟨ʔ⟩, for the glottal stop, extends to the baseline as in 1893 but with serifs, replacing the shape similar or identical to a dotless question mark used in previous charts.
- ⟨⟩, the compromise form approved in 1938, replacing ⟨ꜧ⟩
- ⟨ʆ, ʓ⟩ for palatalized [ʃ, ʒ]
- ⟨ɼ⟩ replacing ⟨ř⟩, approved in 1945
- ⟨ƞ⟩ for the Japanese syllabic nasal
- ⟨ɧ⟩ for a combination of [x] and [ʃ]
- ⟨ɩ, ɷ⟩ replacing ⟨ɪ, ʊ⟩, approved in 1943 while condoning the use of the latter except in the Association's official publications
- ⟨ƾ, ƻ⟩ as alternatives for [t͡s, d͡z]
- R-coloured vowels: ⟨eɹ⟩, ⟨aɹ⟩, ⟨ɔɹ⟩, etc., ⟨eʴ⟩, ⟨aʴ⟩, ⟨ɔʴ⟩, etc., or ⟨ᶒ⟩, ⟨ᶏ⟩, ⟨ᶗ⟩, etc.
- R-coloured [ə]: ⟨əɹ⟩, ⟨əʴ⟩, ⟨ɹ⟩, or ⟨ᶕ⟩
- ⟨◌̟, ◌˖⟩ and ⟨◌̠, ◌˗⟩ (or with serifs, as in ⟨◌I⟩) for advanced and retracted, respectively, officially replacing ⟨◌꭫, ◌꭪⟩

The word "plosives" in the description of ejectives and the qualifier "slightly" in the definitions of ⟨˔, ˕⟩ were removed.

In 1948, script ⟨ɡ⟩ and loop-tail ⟨g⟩ were approved as typographic alternatives. It was acknowledged that loop-tail ⟨g⟩ might be used for a velar plosive versus script ⟨ɡ⟩ (or preferably ⟨⟩) for an advanced velar plosive where the two need to be distinguished, as in Russian. The 1949 Principles would repeat this recommendation but did not mention their equivalence elsewhere. Nevertheless, the recommendation was hardly adopted, not even in Russian. and the question of whether the symbols should be equivalent was taken up again at the 1989 Kiel Convention.

== 1949 Principles ==
The 1949 Principles of the International Phonetic Association was the last installment in the series until it was superseded by the Handbook of the IPA in 1999. It introduced some minimal conceptual changes:

- ⟨ˌ⟩ was defined as an indicator of "medium" rather than "secondary" stress.
- ⟨ʞ⟩ was explicitly defined as a velar click, whereas previously it had been identified as the Khoekhoe click not found in Xhosa (that is, as a palatal click). This corresponds to a misidentification in Jones' writing of the Khoekhoe click as velar, and of course was the motivation for the choice of the symbol.

There were a few other specifications, but they were abortive:

- Inserting a hyphen between a plosive and a homorganic fricative to denote they are separately pronounced, as in ⟨t-s⟩, ⟨d-z⟩, ⟨t-ʃ⟩.
- ⟨eh⟩, ⟨ah⟩, etc. or ⟨e̔⟩, ⟨a̔⟩, etc. for "vowels pronounced with 'breathy voice' (h-coloured vowels)". (Aspiration was now typeset as a reversed comma, ⟨Cʽ⟩.)
- ⟨m̆b⟩, ⟨n̆d⟩, etc. "to show that a nasal consonant is very short and that the intimate combination with the following plosive counts as a single sound", in parallel to use for non-syllabic vowels.
- ⟨ƞ⟩ could be used for an underspecified nasal vowel or coda.
- Script ⟨ɡ⟩ versus loop-tail ⟨g⟩, as suggested in 1948.
- An "arbitrarily chosen mark" such as ⟨˟⟩ or ⟨ˇ⟩ for a Swedish or Norwegian compound tone, as in [ˇandən] ("the spirit").

None of these specifications were inherited in subsequent charts.

== 1950 addition and 1951 chart ==
In 1950 the IPA council approved ⟨ɚ⟩ as yet another alternative to an r-coloured [ə]. Conceived by John S. Kenyon, the letter was in itself a combination of ⟨ə⟩ and the hook for retroflex consonants approved by the IPA in 1927. Since its introduction in 1935, the letter was widely adopted by American linguists and the IPA had been asked to recognize it as part of the alphabet.

The chart was republished in 1951.

		Bi-labial		Labio- dental	Dental and Alveolar			Retroflex	Palato- alveolar	Alveolo- palatal	Palatal	Velar	Uvular	Pharyngal	Glottal
Consonants	Plosive	p b			t d			ʈ ɖ			c ɟ	k ɡ	q ɢ		ʔ
Consonants	Nasal	m		ɱ	n			ɳ			ɲ	ŋ	ɴ		
Consonants	Lateral Fricative				ɬ										
Consonants	Lateral Non-fricative				l			ɭ			ʎ				
Consonants	Rolled				r								ʀ		
Consonants	Flapped				ɾ			ɽ					ʀ		
Consonants	Fricative	ɸ β		f v	θ ð	s z	ɹ	ʂ ʐ	ʃ ʒ	ɕ ʑ	ç j	x ɣ	χ ʁ	ħ ʕ	h ɦ
Consonants	Frictionless Continuants and Semi-vowels	w	ɥ	ʋ	ɹ						j (ɥ)	(w)	ʁ		
Vowels											Front Central Back				
Vowels	Close	(y ʉ u) (ø o) (œ ɔ) (ɒ)									i yɨ ʉɯ u e øɤ o ə ɛ œʌ ɔ æɐ aɑ ɒ				
Vowels	Half-close	(y ʉ u) (ø o) (œ ɔ) (ɒ)									i yɨ ʉɯ u e øɤ o ə ɛ œʌ ɔ æɐ aɑ ɒ				
Vowels	Half-open	(y ʉ u) (ø o) (œ ɔ) (ɒ)									i yɨ ʉɯ u e øɤ o ə ɛ œʌ ɔ æɐ aɑ ɒ				
Vowels	Open	(y ʉ u) (ø o) (œ ɔ) (ɒ)									i yɨ ʉɯ u e øɤ o ə ɛ œʌ ɔ æɐ aɑ ɒ				
(Secondary articulations are shown by symbols in brackets.)

Other Sounds.—Palatalized consonants: ƫ, ᶁ, etc.; palatalized ʃ, ʒ: ʆ, ʓ Velarized or pharyngealized consonants: ɫ, ᵭ, ᵴ, etc. Ejective consonants (with simultaneous glottal stop): pʼ, tʼ, etc. Implosive voiced consonants: ɓ, ɗ, etc. ɼ fricative trill. σ, ƍ (labialized θ, ð, or s, z). ƪ, ƺ (labialized ʃ, ʒ). ʇ, ʗ, ʖ (clicks, Zulu c, q, x). ɺ (a sound between r and l). ƞ Japanese syllabic nasal. ɧ (combination of x and ʃ). ʍ (voiceless w). ɩ, ʏ, ɷ (lowered varieties of i, y, u). ᴈ (a variety of ə). ɵ (a vowel between ø and o).

Affricates are normally represented by groups of two consonants (ts, tʃ, dʒ, etc.), but, when necessary, ligatures are used (ʦ, ʧ, ʤ, etc.), or the marks ͡ or ͜ (t͡s or t͜s, etc.). ͡ ͜ also denote synchronic articulation (m͡ŋ = simultaneous m and ŋ). c, ɟ may occasionally be used in place of tʃ, dʒ, and ƾ, ƻ in place of ts, dz. Aspirated plosives: ph, th, etc. r-coloured vowels: eɹ, aɹ, ɔɹ etc., or eʴ, aʴ, ɔʴ, etc., or ᶒ, ᶏ, ᶗ, etc.; r-coloured ə: əɹ or əʴ or ɹ or ᶕ or ɚ.

Length, Stress, Pitch.— ː (full length). ˑ (half length). ˈ (stress, placed at the beginning of the stressed syllable). ˌ (secondary stress). ˉ (high level pitch); ˍ (low level); ˊ (high rising); ˏ (low rising); ˋ (high falling); ˎ (low falling); ˆ (rise-fall); ˇ (fall-rise).

Modifiers.— ˜ nasality. ˳ breath (l̥ = breathed l). ˬ voice (s̬ = z). ʻ slight aspiration following p, t, etc. ̫ labialization (n̫ = labialized n). ̪ dental articulation (t̪ = dental t). ˙ palatalization (ż = ᶎ). ̣ specially close vowel (ẹ = a very close e). ̜ specially open vowel (e̜ = a rather open e). ˔ tongue raised (e˔ or e̝ = ẹ). ˕ tongue lowered (e˕ or e̞ = e̜). ˖ tongue advanced (u˖ or u̟ = an advanced u, t̟ = t̪). ˗ or tongue retracted (i˗ or i̠ = ɨ˖, t̠ = alveolar t). ˒ lips more rounded. ˓ lips more spread. Central vowels ï (= ɨ), ü (= ʉ), ë (= ə˔), ö (= ɵ), ɛ̈, ɔ̈. ˌ (e.g. n̩) syllabic consonant. ˘ consonantal vowel. ʃˢ variety of ʃ resembling s, etc.

== 1973 addition and 1976 revision ==
In 1973, ⟨ɻ⟩ was approved for a retroflex approximant, in line with the other retroflex consonants.

The letters ⟨š⟩, ⟨ž⟩, ⟨č⟩, and ⟨ǰ⟩ or ⟨ǧ⟩ were proposed as alternatives to [ʃ, ʒ, tʃ, dʒ], but the vote was inconclusive. Additional proposals of ⟨◌̢⟩ (subscript, not attached) for retroflexion, ⟨◌̮⟩ for palatalization and ⟨◌̯⟩ for indicating a non-fricative continuant (i.e. an approximant) were rejected.

In 1976 the IPA council voted on a number of proposals for reform, several of which were already in unofficial use. The following changes were approved:

- ⟨ɶ⟩ for the rounded equivalent of [a] (taken from the accompanying text to Daniel Jones's 1956 recording of the Secondary Cardinal Vowels).
- ⟨◌̈⟩ to mean "centralized" rather than "central".
- ⟨ʰ⟩ for aspiration. (Though this was approved merely as an alternative to ⟨ʻ⟩, neither the latter diacritic nor the baseline letter ⟨h⟩ were mentioned for aspiration in the 1979 chart.)
- ⟨◌̚⟩ for absence of audible release (omitted in the 1979 chart).
- ⟨ʘ⟩ for a bilabial click.
- ⟨◌̤⟩ for breathy voice.
- ⟨ɰ⟩ for a velar approximant.
- Application of ⟨◌̣, ◌̜⟩ (but not of ⟨◌̝ , ◌̞⟩ or of ⟨◌˔, ◌˕⟩) to consonant letters to distinguish fricative and approximant, respectively, as in ⟨ɹ̣, ɹ̜⟩.

On the same occasion, the following letters and diacritics were retired because they had "fallen into disuse":

- ⟨◌̇⟩ for palatalization.
- ⟨ƾ, ƻ⟩ for [t͡s, d͡z].
- ⟨ƞ⟩ for the Japanese moraic nasal.
- ⟨σ, ƍ, ƪ, ƺ⟩ for labialized [θ, ð, ʃ, ʒ].
- ⟨◌̢⟩ for r-colouring, as in ⟨ᶒ, ᶏ, ᶗ, ᶕ⟩.

Other proposals failed. These included ⟨ɘ⟩ for a close-mid central unrounded vowel, ⟨ɞ⟩ for an open-mid central rounded vowel, and ⟨ᴀ⟩ for an open central unrounded vowel, all of which were rejected. (The proposal of ⟨ɘ, ɞ⟩ was based on Abercrombie (1967), p. 161 and would be approved in a later revision.) ⟨ʝ⟩ for a voiced palatal fricative and ⟨◌̰⟩ for creaky voice were also proposed but the vote was inconclusive.

== 1979 chart ==
In 1979, a revised chart appeared, incorporating the developments in the alphabet which were made earlier in the decade:

THE INTERNATIONAL PHONETIC ALPHABET (Revised to 1979)

Bilabial
Labiodental
Dental,
Alveolar, or
Post-alveolar
Retroflex
Palato-
alveolar
Palatal
Velar
Uvular
Labial-
Palatal
Labial-
Velar
Pharyngeal
Glottal
CONSONANTS
(pulmonic air-stream mechanism)
Nasal

m

ɱ

n

ɳ

ɲ

ŋ

ɴ

Plosive
p
b

t

d

ʈ
ɖ

c
ɟ
k
ɡ
q
ɢ

k͡p
g͡b
ʔ
(Median)
Fricative
ɸ
β
f
v
θ
ð
s
z

ʂ
ʐ
ʃ
ʒ
ç
j
x
ɣ
χ
ʁ

ʍ

ħ
ʕ
h
ɦ
(Median)
Approximant

ʋ

ɹ

ɻ

j

ɰ

ɥ

w

Lateral
Fricative

ɬ

Lateral
(Approximant)

l

ɭ

ʎ

Trill

r

ʀ

Tap or Flap
ɾ

ɽ
ʀ
(non-pulmonic
air-stream)
Ejective
pʼ

tʼ

kʼ

Implosive

ɓ

ɗ

ɠ

(Median) Click
ʘ

ʇ

ʗ

Lateral Click

ʖ

DIACRITICS
OTHER SYMBOLS

̥	Voiceless n̥ d̥
̬	Voiced s̬ t̬
ʰ	Aspirated tʰ
̤	Breathy-voiced b̤ ə̤
̪	Dental t̪
̫	Labialized t̫
̡	Palatalized ƫ
̴	Velarized or Pharyn- gealized ᵵ, ɫ
̩	Syllabic n̩ l̩
͡ or ͜	Simultaneous s͜f (but see also under the heading Affricates)

˔ or ̣	Raised e˔, e̝, ẹ ẉ
˕ or ̜	Lowered e˕, e̞, e̜ ʁ̨
˖	Advanced u˖, u̟
˗ or ɪ	Retracted i̠, i˗, t̠
¨	Centralized ë
̃	Nasalized ɑ̃
ʴ, ʵ, ʶ	r-coloured ɑʴ
ː	Long ɑː
ˑ	Half-long ɑˑ
˘	Non-syllabic ŭ
˒	More rounded ɔ˒
˓	Less rounded y˓

ɕ, ʑ	Alveolo-palatal fricatives
ʆ, ʓ	Palatalized ʃ, ʒ
ɼ	Alveolar fricative trill
ɺ	Alveolar lateral flap
ɧ	Simultaneous ʃ and x
ʃˢ	Variety of ʃ resembling s, etc.
ɪ	= ɩ
ʊ	= ɷ
ɜ	= Variety of ə
ɚ	= r-coloured ə

Front Back
iɨɯ ɩ eɤ ə ɛʌ æɐ aɑ
Unrounded
VOWELS
Close
Half-close
Half-open
Open
Front Back
yʉu ʏ ɷ øo ɵ œɔ
ɶɒ
Rounded
STRESS, TONE (PITCH)

ˈ stress, placed at begin-
ning of stressed syllable:
ˌ secondary stress: ˉ high
level pitch, high tone:
ˍ low level: ˊ high rising:
ˏ low rising: ˋ high falling:
ˎ low falling: ˆ rise-fall:
ˇ fall-rise.

AFFRICATES can be
written as digraphs, as
ligatures, or with slur
marks; thus ts, tʃ, dʒ:
ʦ ʧ ʤ: t͡s t͡ʃ d͡ʒ.
c, ɟ may occasionally be
used for tʃ, dʒ.

⟨ɩ, ʏ, ɷ⟩, previously defined as "lowered varieties of i, y, u", appeared slightly centered rather than simply midway between [i, y, u] and [e, ø, o] as they did in the 1912 chart. ⟨ɪ, ʊ⟩, the predecessors to ⟨ɩ, ɷ⟩, were acknowledged as alternatives to ⟨ɩ, ɷ⟩ under the section "Other symbols". ⟨ɵ⟩ appeared as the rounded counterpart to [ə] rather than between [ø] and [o].

The name of the column "Dental and alveolar" was changed to "Dental, alveolar, or post-alveolar". "Pharyngeal", "trill", "tap or flap", and "approximant" replaced "pharyngal", "rolled", "flapped", and "frictionless continuants", respectively. ⟨ɹ, ʁ⟩, which were listed twice in both the fricative and frictionless continuant rows in the previous charts, now appeared as an approximant and a fricative, respectively, while the line between the rows was erased, indicating certain fricative letters may represent approximants and vice versa, with the employment of the raised and lowered diacritics if necessary. ⟨ʍ⟩, previously defined as "voiceless w", was specified as a fricative. ⟨j⟩ remained listed twice in the fricative and approximant rows. ⟨ɺ⟩, previously defined merely as "a sound between r and l", was redefined as an alveolar lateral flap, in keeping with the use for which it had been originally approved, "a sound between l and d".

== 1989 Kiel Convention ==
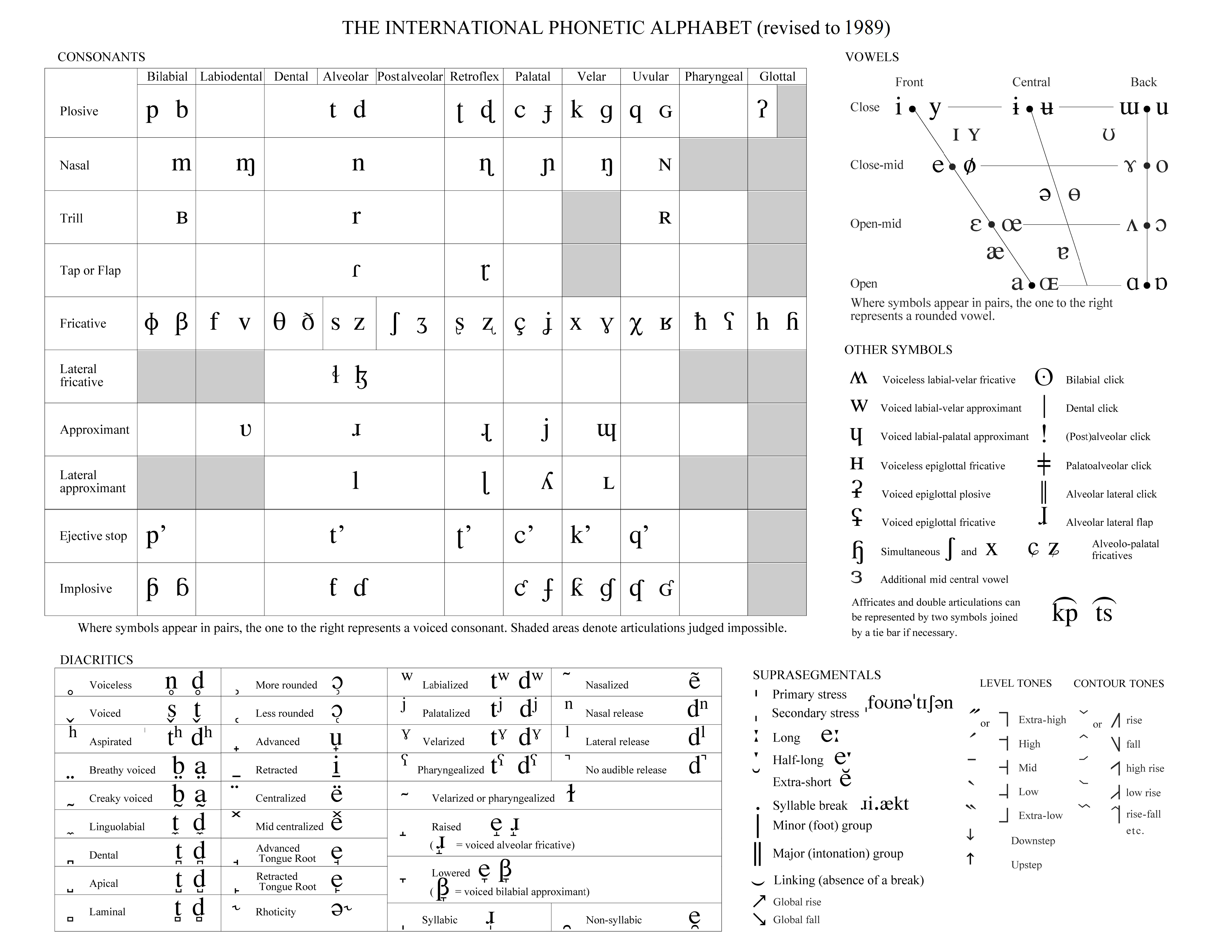
The IPA in 1989 (recreated from the 2005 chart; some glyphs may not be accurate)

By the 1980s, phonetic theories had developed so much since the inception of the alphabet that the framework of it had become outdated. To resolve this, at the initiative of IPA President Peter Ladefoged, approximately 120 members of the IPA gathered at a convention held in Kiel, West Germany, in August 1989, to discuss revisions of both the alphabet and the principles it is founded upon. It was at this convention that it was decided that the Handbook of the IPA (International Phonetic Association 1999) would be written and published to supersede the 1949 Principles.

In addition to the revisions of the alphabet, two workgroups were set up, one on computer coding of IPA characters and computer representation of individual languages, and the other on pathological speech and voice quality. The former group concluded that each IPA character should be assigned a three-digit number for computer coding known as IPA Number, which was published in the appendices of the 1999 Handbook. The latter devised a set of recommendations for the transcription of disordered speech based on the IPA known as the Extensions to the International Phonetic Alphabet or extIPA, which was published in 1990 and adopted by the International Clinical Phonetics and Linguistics Association, which now maintains it, in 1994.

A drastically renewed chart of the alphabet reflecting decisions made at the convention appeared later in the year. Additions were:

- Consonants
  - ⟨ʙ⟩ for a voiced bilabial trill
  - ⟨ʝ⟩ for a voiced palatal fricative, with ⟨j⟩ now standing for only the approximant
  - ⟨ʟ⟩ for a voiced velar lateral approximant (proposed at least as far back as 1926)
  - ⟨ʄ, ʛ⟩ for voiced palatal and uvular implosives
  - ⟨ƥ, ƭ, ƈ, ƙ, ʠ⟩ for voiceless implosives
  - ⟨ʜ, ʢ⟩ for epiglottal fricatives
  - ⟨ʡ⟩ for a voiced epiglottal plosive [sic]
  - ⟨ǀ, ǃ, ǁ, ǂ⟩ for dental, (post)alveolar, alveolar lateral and palatal clicks, replacing ⟨ʇ, ʖ, ʗ⟩ and obsolescent ⟨ʞ⟩ (see click letter)
- Diacritics
  - ⟨◌̰⟩ for creaky voice
  - ⟨◌̼, ◌̺, ◌̻⟩ for linguolabial, apical, and laminal
  - ⟨◌̹, ◌̜⟩ for more and less rounded, now placed under the letter
  - ⟨◌̽⟩ for mid-centralized
  - ⟨◌̘, ◌̙⟩ for advanced and retracted tongue root
  - ⟨◌ ˞⟩ for rhoticity
  - ⟨◌ʷ⟩ for labialization, replacing ⟨◌̫⟩
  - ⟨◌ʲ⟩ for palatalization, replacing ⟨◌̡⟩
  - ⟨◌ˠ, ◌ˤ⟩ for velarization and pharyngealization, augmenting ⟨◌̴⟩
  - ⟨◌ⁿ, ◌ˡ⟩ for nasal and lateral release
  - ⟨◌̯⟩ for non-syllabic, replacing ⟨◌̆⟩, which now stood for extra-short
- Suprasegmentals
  - ⟨◌̆⟩, which had previously stood for non-syllabic, for extra-short
  - ⟨.⟩ for a syllable break
  - ⟨|, ‖⟩ for minor (foot) and major (intonation) groups
  - ⟨‿⟩ for linking (absence of a break)
  - ⟨↗, ↘⟩ for global rise and fall of pitch
  - ⟨ꜜ, ꜛ⟩ for downstep and upstep

Tone, which had been indicated with an iconic line preceding the syllable or above or below the vowel, was now written one of two ways: with a similar iconic line following the syllable and anchored to a vertical bar, as in ⟨˥, ˦, ˧˩˨⟩ (Chao's tone letters), or with more abstract diacritics written over the vowel (acute = high, macron = mid, grave = low), which could be compounded with each other, as in ⟨ə᷄, ə᷆, ə᷈, ə̋, ə̏⟩.

The palato-alveolar column was removed and ⟨ʃ, ʒ⟩ were listed alongside the postalveolars. ⟨ɹ⟩ appeared at the same horizontal position as the other alveolars rather than slightly more back as did in the previous charts. ⟨ʀ⟩ was specified as a trill rather than either a trill or flap. The alternative raised and lowered diacritics ⟨◌̣, ◌̜⟩ were eliminated in favour of ⟨◌̝, ◌̞⟩, which could now be attached to consonants to denote fricative or approximant, as in ⟨ɹ̝, β̞⟩. Diacritics for relative articulation placed next to, rather than below, a letter, namely ⟨◌˖, ◌˗ (◌ɪ ), ◌˔, ◌˕⟩, were no longer mentioned. The diacritic for no audible release ⟨◌̚⟩ was finally mentioned in the chart.

⟨ɩ, ɷ⟩ were eliminated in favour of ⟨ɪ, ʊ⟩. The letter for the close-mid back unrounded vowel was modified from ⟨⟩ ("baby gamma"), with a flat top, to ⟨⟩ ("ram's horns"), with a rounded top, to better distinguish it from ⟨ɣ⟩, which represents a voiced velar fricative. ⟨ɮ⟩ was revived in place of ⟨⟩. ⟨ɚ⟩ was no longer mentioned, and instead a right-hook diacritic ⟨˞⟩ was added for rhoticity; the superscript rhotic diacritics were retired.

⟨ʆ, ʓ⟩ for palatalized [ʃ, ʒ] and ⟨ɼ⟩ for the alveolar fricative trill were withdrawn (now written ⟨ʃʲ, ʒʲ⟩ and ⟨r̝⟩). The affricate ligatures were withdrawn. The tie bar below letters for affricates and doubly articulated consonants, as in ⟨t͜s⟩, was no longer mentioned. The practice of placing a superscript letter to indicate the resemblance to a sound, previously illustrated by ⟨ʃˢ⟩, was no longer explicitly recommended.

At the convention, proposals such as ⟨⟩ for a voiced labial–velar fricative, ⟨⟩ for a voiceless velar lateral fricative, ⟨ɮ⟩ for a voiced velar lateral fricative, ⟨⟩ for a voiceless palatal lateral fricative, ⟨ŝ, ẑ⟩ for "the 'hissing-hussing' fricatives of some Caucasian languages", and ⟨ᴀ⟩ for an open central unrounded vowel were discussed but dismissed.

=== New principles ===
The six principles set out in 1888 were replaced by a much longer text consisting of seven paragraphs. The first two paragraphs established the alphabet's purpose, namely to be "a set of symbols for representing all the possible sounds of the world's languages" and "representing fine distinctions of sound quality, making the IPA well suited for use in all disciplines in which the representation of speech sounds is required". The second paragraph also said: "[p] is a shorthand way of designating the intersection of the categories voiceless, bilabial, and plosive; [m] is the intersection of the categories voiced, bilabial, and nasal; and so on", refining the previous, less clearly defined principle #2 with the application of the distinctive feature theory. Discouragement of diacritics was relaxed, though recommending their use be limited: "(i) For denoting length, stress and pitch. (ii) For representing minute shades of sounds. (iii) When the introduction of a single diacritic obviates the necessity for designing a number of new symbols (as, for instance, in the representation of nasalized vowels)". The principles also adopted the recommendation of enclosing phonetic transcriptions in square brackets [ ] and phonemic ones in slashes / /, a practice that had emerged in the 1940s. The principles were reprinted in the 1999 Handbook.

== 1993 revision and 1996 'correction' ==
Following the 1989 revision, a number of proposals for revisions appeared in the Journal of the IPA, which were submitted to the Council of the IPA. In 1993, the Council approved the following changes:

- ⟨ƥ, ƭ, ƈ, ƙ, ʠ⟩ for the voiceless implosives were withdrawn.
- The non-pulmonic consonants (ejectives and implosives) were removed from the main table and set up with the clicks in a separate section, with ⟨ʼ⟩ acknowledged as an independent modifier for ejective (therefore allowing combinations absent in the chart).
- It was noted that subdiacritics may be moved above a letter to avoid interference with a descender.
- The central vowels of the 1921 chart were restored, bringing the total back to eight: close ⟨ɨ ʉ⟩, close-mid ⟨ɘ ɵ⟩, mid ⟨ə⟩, open-mid ⟨ɜ ʚ⟩, and near-open ⟨ɐ⟩.
- The right half of the cell for pharyngeal plosives was shaded, indicating the impossibility of a voiced pharyngeal plosive.

On the same occasion, it was reaffirmed that ⟨ɡ⟩ and ⟨⟩ are typographic alternatives.

The revised chart was now portrait-oriented. ⟨ə⟩ and ⟨ɐ⟩ were moved to the centerline of the vowel chart, indicating that they are not necessarily unrounded. The word "voiced" was removed from the definition for ⟨ʡ⟩, now simply "epiglottal plosive". "Other symbols" and diacritics were slightly rearranged. The outer stroke of the letter for a bilabial click ⟨ʘ⟩ was modified from a circle with a uniform line width to the shape of uppercase O.

In 1996, it was announced that the form of the open-mid central rounded vowel in the 1993 chart, ⟨ʚ⟩, was a typographical error and should be changed to ⟨ɞ⟩, stating the latter was the form that "J. C. Catford had in mind when he proposed the central vowel changes ... in 1990", also citing Abercrombie (1967) and Catford (1977), who had ⟨ɞ⟩. However, the letter Catford had proposed for the value in both 1988 and 1990 was in fact ⟨ꞓ⟩ (a barred ⟨ɔ⟩), with an alternative being ⟨ɞ⟩. Errata for Catford (1990) appeared in 1992, but the printed form was again ⟨ʚ⟩ and the errata even acknowledged that ⟨ʚ⟩ was included in Association phonétique internationale (1921), pp. 6–7, as pointed out by David Abercrombie.

== 1999 Handbook ==
The 1999 Handbook of the International Phonetic Association was the first book outlining the specifications of the alphabet in 50 years, superseding the 1949 Principles of the IPA. It consisted of just over 200 pages, four times as long as the Principles. In addition to what was seen in the 1996 chart, the book included ⟨ᵊ⟩ for mid central vowel release, ⟨ᶿ⟩ for voiceless dental fricative release, and ⟨ˣ⟩ for voiceless velar fricative release as part of the official IPA in the "Computer coding of IPA symbols" section. The section also included ⟨ᶑ ⟩ for a voiced retroflex implosive, noting it was "not explicitly IPA approved". The book also said ⟨ᶹ⟩ "might be used" for "a secondary reduction of the lip opening accompanied by neither protrusion nor velar constriction". It abandoned the 1949 Principles' recommendation of alternating ⟨⟩ and ⟨ɡ⟩ for ordinary and advanced velar plosives, and acknowledged both shapes as acceptable variants.

In the updated chart, which was published in the front matter, the subsections were rearranged so that the left edge of the vowel chart appeared right beneath the palatal column, hinting at the palatal place of articulation for [i, y], as did in all pre-1989 charts, though the space did not allow the back vowels to appear beneath the velars. A tie bar placed below letters, as in ⟨t͜s⟩, was mentioned again. ⟨˞⟩ was now attached to the preceding letter, as in ⟨ə˞⟩. A few illustrations in the chart were changed: ⟨a˞⟩ was added for rhoticity, and ⟨i̠, ɹ̩⟩ were replaced with ⟨e̠, n̩⟩. The examples of "high rising" and "low rising" tone contours were changed from ⟨˦˥⟩ (mid-H–H) and ⟨˩˨⟩ (L–mid-L) to ⟨˧˥⟩ (M–H) and ⟨˩˧⟩ (L–M), respectively. The word "etc." was dropped from the list of contours, though the 1999 Handbook would continue to use contours that did not appear on the chart.

== 2005 addition ==
In 2005, ⟨ⱱ⟩ was added for the labiodental flap. This is the most recent substantial change to the alphabet.

== Other 21st-century developments ==
The 2005 chart

In 2011, it was once again proposed that ⟨ᴀ⟩ be added to represent the open central unrounded vowel, but this was declined by the Council the following year.

=== Minor changes to the IPA chart ===
In 2012, the IPA chart and its subparts were released under the Creative Commons Attribution-ShareAlike 3.0 Unported License.

In 2016, three versions of a revised chart dated 2015 were released online, each with the characters rendered in a different typeface (IPA Kiel / LS Uni developed by Linguist's Software, Doulos SIL, and DejaVu Sans). No character was added or withdrawn, but some notes and the shapes of a few were slightly modified. In particular, composite ⟨ə˞⟩ was replaced by atomic ⟨ɚ⟩, with a continuous, slanted stroke, and the example of a "rising–falling" tone contour was changed from ⟨˦˥˦⟩ (mid-H–H–mid-H) to ⟨˧˦˧⟩ (M–mid-H–M).

In 2018, another slightly modified chart in different fonts was released, this time also in TeX TIPA Roman developed by Rei Fukui, which was selected as best representing the IPA symbol set by the Association's Alphabet, Charts and Fonts committee, established the previous year. The example of a "rising–falling" tone contour was again changed from ⟨˧˦˧⟩ (M–mid-H–M) to ⟨˧˦˨⟩ (M–mid-H–mid-L).

In 2020, another set of charts was released, with the only changes being minor adjustments in the layout, and Creative Commons icons replacing the copyright sign.

=== Increased Unicode support ===
In 2020 and 2024, the IPA made formal requests to Unicode for support of a number of as-yet unencoded symbols. These were:

- Ligatures for the remaining coronal affricates, including historical tʆ and dʓ and extIPA tꞎ and d𝼅.
- Positional variants of all IPA and extIPA diacritics. (Only superscript variants were needed, as Unicode already supported subscript variants of all superscript diacritics.)
- The double caron tone mark mentioned in the Kiel report.
- Barred w and ɥ as para-IPA central semivowels.
- Superscript variants of all consonant letters, vowel letters and length marks, excluding only the rhotic vowel letters, and including the 'implied' retroflex letters ⟨ᶑ 𝼈 𝼉 𝼊⟩, plus all extIPA fricatives and a number of historical and para-IPA letters, namely the pre-Kiel click letters, ⟨ʇ ʗ ʖ ʞ⟩ and para-IPA ⟨𝼋 ψ⟩; the voiceless implosive letters, ⟨ƥ ƭ 𝼉 ƈ ƙ ʠ ⟩; the Sinological extensions to the IPA, ⟨ȶ ȡ ȵ ȴ ᴀ ᴇ ω ɿ ʅ ʮ ʯ ⟩; the most common remaining palatal-hook letters, ⟨ᶁ ᶇ ᶊ ᶎ⟩; the historical and unofficial letters ⟨ᴅ ȸ ȹ 𝼙 ɉ ƞ ɼ ʆ ᶘ 𝼜 ᵿ ᶚ ʓ⟩; as well as the tʆ and dʓ ligatures and barred w and ɥ mentioned above.

=== 2029 IPA Convention ===
A convention is planned for 2029, marking 40 years since the Kiel Convention.

== ExtIPA ==
The Extensions to the International Phonetic Alphabet were devised at the 1989 Kiel Convention and later augmented by the International Clinical Phonetics and Linguistics Association. It originally included the core of what would later be split off as the Voice Quality Symbols.

=== 1989 list of symbols ===
The initial extensions to the IPA that emerged from the Kiel Convention were as follows. The account was presented as a list of symbols with some brief explanations. The following are the letters and the examples given for the diacritics; the diacritics were also shown in isolation as in the charts later. The explanations are not repeated here; details can be found at extIPA or in the relevant phonetic articles.

Other segmental features
Symbols and diacritics

Place of articulation and/or co-occurring articulatory features

- labiodental plosives and nasal – [p̪] [b̪] [m̪]
- dentolabial plosives and nasal – [p͆] [b͆] [m͆]
- labial spreading – [s͍] [t͍]
- interdental articulation – [t̪͆] [θ̪͆] [l̪͆]
- bidental articulation – [h̪͆] [u̪͆]
- bidental percussive – [ʭ]

Manner of articulation

- denasal – [m͊] [n͊]
- nasal escape – [p͋] [f͋]
- [h͜m] [h͜n]: nareal fricatives
- [ʩ]: velopharyngeal fricative
- velopharyngeal friction accompanying another sound – [p͌] [s͌]
- stronger and weaker articulation – [f͈] [m͉]
- reiterated articulation – [p\p\p]
- [ʪ] [ʫ]: lateralized [s] and [z]
- whistled articulation – [s͎]

Airstream

- [↓]: ingressive airflow for a segment which is normally egressive – [p↓]; also, inhalation
- [↑]: egressive airflow for a segment which is normally ingressive – [ǃ↑]; also, exhalation
- silent articulation or 'mouthing' – (ʃ)

Vocal fold activity

- pre- and post-voicing of segments – [ˬb] [zˬ]
- partial devoicing of a normally voiced segment – [z̥᪽]
- initial/final partial devoicing – [ḁ᫃] [m̥᫄]
- partial voicing of a normally unvoiced segment – [f̬᪽]
- initial/final partial voicing – [h̬᫃] [s̬᫄]
- pre-aspiration – [ʰp]

Degrees of indeterminacy
Note: "This is intended for those cases where, for reasons of severe distortion (e.g. due to pathological condition), the phonetic specification of an utterance cannot be made with a reasonable degree of accuracy."

- ( ̲̅ ̲̅): a segment is perceived but no features can be identified
  ○: the circle or balloon is the cursive form
  (on p. 37 this is called a 'balloon' and shown as an oval.)
- (C̲̅) or (V̲̅): segments perceived to be consonantal or vocalic but no additional features can be identified with certainty.

Identified features may be included, and separated by commas for clarity. The examples given are (S̲̅) [stop], (P̲̅a̲̅l̲̅) [palatal], (F̲̅,̲̅ ̲̅B̲̅i̲̅l̲̅) [a bilabial fricative, illustrating two features], (S̬̲̅) [a voiced stop, illustrating the use of a diacritic]. IPA symbols may be used when the transcriber is 'not quite sure', such as (t̲̅) for what is thought to be [t]. This is a manual typewriter hack, intended to "imitate the use of hand-drawn circles or ovals around the relevant terms in a hand-written transcription." It was inherited from PRDS (Phonetic Representation of Disordered Speech) symbols developed since 1980.

- double parentheses around one or more segments indicate that sounds were obscured by extraneous noise – ((2 sylls))
  Note: "An attempt may be made at an orthographic or segmental transcription, or the space may be left blank."
- *: the asterisk is used to make reference to segments for which no symbol is provided – [hi hæ*] 'he has'
  Note: "There should be a note describing the way in which the segment indicated by the asterisk was produced."

Voice quality

Provision is made for indicating that a feature applies to a longer span of transcription than the single letter that a diacritic normally modifies. Such expanded scope is abstracted from standard IPA convention by means of labelled curly braces. "Voice quality" here describes any such feature that is characteristic of the speaker's voice in that moment, not to voiced phonation. The examples are,

- [ {V̤ xxx V̤} ] for part of an utterance produced with breathy voice on all susceptible segments xxx.

All IPA diacritics may be used in this fashion. Besides IPA-based [ {V̤ xxx V̤} ] for breathy voice and [ {V̰ xxx V̰} ] for creak, extIPA provided at this time [ {Ṿ xxx Ṿ} ] (whisper), [ {V‼ xxx V‼} ] (ventricular/harsh), and [ {F xxx F} ] (falsetto).

- [ {Vʷ xxx Vʷ} ] for part of an utterance produced with labialized articulatory setting on all susceptible segments xxx.

Other IPA letters may be superscripted for this purpose; specifically, [ᵛ] is provided to indicate labiodentalized speech.

Other features of connected speech

- [ (.) ], [ (..) ], [ (...) ] for short, medium and long pauses.
- The musical abbreviations [ {_{f} xxx _{f}} ], [ {_{ff} xxx _{ff}} ], [ {_{p} xxx _{p}} ], [ {_{allegro} xxx _{allegro}} ], [ {_{lento} xxx _{lento}} ].

These are explained in the charts below.

=== 1990 report ===
The first publication by the ICPLA was in 1990. It summarized the relationship between the new extIPA and the prior PRDS recommendations. A few points and examples were made beyond what was presented in the Kiel report:

- [ {V↓ xxx V↓} ] and [ {(V) xxx (V)} ] can be used for a stretch of speech with an ingressive or zero/silent airstream. [ {V̪ xxx V̪} ] is given as an additional example of marking a speaker's voice quality, in this case for an dental articulation of all susceptible segments xxx.
- Normal partial voicing or devoicing should be transcribed with a simple wedge or ring diacritic; surrounding them with single and double parentheses suggests that the voicing or devoicing is atypical for the language.
- There is clarification that the "parentheses linked by a superscript and a subscript line," ( ̲̅ ̲̅), are an optional typescript rendition of the handwritten balloon. This convention (in either format) can be extended to longer sequences, though typically the focus is on a single segment.
- [t(.)weɫv̥] for [tʷw̥eɫv̥] is provided as an example of a lack of co-articulation between adjacent segments.

=== 1994 chart ===
An ICPLA symposium in 1994 approved a few changes, such as withdrawing their suggestion for ⟨m̪⟩ as in conflict with traditional IPA (a proposal to retire ⟨ɱ⟩ at Kiel had failed), and replacing sequences such as ⟨h͜n⟩ with the synonymous diacritic: ⟨n͋⟩. The basic extIPA was now presented on a chart, paralleling the traditional IPA chart:

Consonants (other than those on the IPA Chart)
	bi- labial	labio- dental	dento- labial	labio- alveolar	linguo- labial	inter- dental	bi- dental	alveolar	velar	velo- phary- ngeal
Plosive		p̪ b̪	p͆ b͆	p͇ b͇	t̼ d̼	t̪͆ d̪͆				
Nasal			m͆	m͇	n̼	n̪͆				
Trill					r̼	r̪͆				
Fricative: central			f͆ v͆	f͇ v͇	θ̼ ð̼	θ̪͆ ð̪͆	h̪͆ ɦ̪͆			ʩ
Fricative: lateral + central								ʪ ʫ		
Fricative: nareal	m͋							n͋	ŋ͋	
Percussive	ʬ						ʭ			
Approximant: lateral					l̼	l̪͆				

Diacritics
͍	labial spreading	s͍	͈	strong articulation	f͈	͊	denasal	m͊
͆	dentolabial	v͆	͉	weak articulation	v͉	͋	nasal escape	m͋
̪͆	interdental/bidental	n̪͆	\	reiterated articulation	p\p\p	̃̃	velopharyngeal friction	s̃̃
͇	alveolar	t͇	͎	whistled articulation	s͎	↓	ingressive airflow	p↓
̼	linguolabial	d̼	͢	sliding articulation	s͢θ	↑	egressive airflow	ǃ↑

CONNECTED SPEECH		VOICING		
(.)	short pause	ˬ◌	pre-voicing	ˬz
(‥)	medium pause	◌ˬ	post-voicing	zˬ
(…)	long pause	◌̥᪽	partial devoicing	z̥᪽
f	loud speech [{_{f} lɑʊd _{f}}]	◌̥᫃	initial partial devoicing	z̥᫃
ff	louder speech [{_{ff} lɑʊdɚ _{ff}}]	◌̥᫄	final partial devoicing	z̥᫄
p	quiet speech [{_{p} kwaɪət _{p}}]	◌̬᪽	partial voicing	s̬᪽
pp	quieter speech [{_{pp} kwaɪətɚ _{pp}}]	◌̬᫃	initial partial voicing	s̬᫃
allegro	fast speech [{_{allegro} fɑːst _{allegro}}]	◌̬᫄	final partial voicing	s̬᫄
lento	slow speech [{_{lento} sloʊ _{lento}}]	◌˭	unaspirated	p˭
crescendo, rallentando, etc. may also be used		ʰ◌	pre-aspiration	ʰp

Others
( ̲̅)	indeterminate sound	( )	silent articulation: (ʃ)
(V̲̅)	indeterminate vowel	(( ))	extraneous noise: ((2 sylls))
(P̲̅l̲̅)	indeterminate plosive	*	sound with no available symbol (to be described elsewhere)
(P̲̅l̲̅,̲̅v̲̅l̲̅s̲̅)	indeterminate voiceless plosive	*	sound with no available symbol (to be described elsewhere)

=== 1997 revision ===
A 1997 revision was published in the 1999 IPA Handbook. Though the Voice Quality Symbols are included, in ICPLA material they had been split off as their own project in 1995.

Chart

The only changes to the chart were to the 'other' table, where the letter ⟨¡⟩ was added. This was defined as:

¡	sublaminal lower alveolar percussive click
ǃ¡	alveolar and sublaminal click ('cluck-click')

Other changes to the 'other' table were minor: '(m)' was added as an example of silent articulation; the note '(to be described elsewhere)' on the asterisk was dropped and the indeterminate vowel and plosive cells were merged to make room for ⟨¡⟩.

List of symbols

In the accompanying list of symbols, the balloon for 'unidentified segment(s)' is formatted as ❍.

Additional capital letters for VoQS are provided, besides V 'voice' and F 'falsetto': W 'whisper', C 'creak', L 'lanynx', J 'jaw', Œ 'oesophageal speech', Θ 'protruded tongue voice', as well as the digits 1 2 3 for slight, moderate and extreme degree.

Labiodentalized was changed from [◌ᵛ] to its current form [◌ᶹ].

Some of the labels differed between the chart and the list, namely 'bidental articulation' for interdental/bidental, 'stronger' and 'weaker' articulation, 'alveolarized', and 'slurred articulation' for what the chart labeled sliding articulation.

New diacritics from the Voice Quality Symbols are:

[◌ʶ]: uvularized
[◌ꟸ]: faucalized
[◌ꟹ]: labialized: open-rounded (as opposed to close-rounded ◌ʷ)
[◌!]: harsh
[◌˭]: unaspirated
[◌͔]: laterally offset to the right
[◌͕]: laterally offset to the left
[◌˷]: creaky

An underdot diacritic for 'whispery' is listed as existing IPA, which it never was; it may have been intended to cover the voice-quality symbol {Ṿ}.

The phonemic and phonetic delimiters /.../ and [...] are specified.

=== 2008 chart ===
In 2004 the obsolete IPA letter ⟨ʞ⟩ had been adopted for a velodorsal consonant. It was added to the 'other' table of the 2008 chart.

(C̲̅) and (N̲̅) were added for an indeterminate consonant and nasal, and the simple plosive was dropped. The examples for indeterminate sounds were consolidated into two cells to make room for the ⟨ʞ⟩.

In the consonant table, the row of 'central' fricatives was renamed to its current wording of 'median' fricatives.

=== 2015/2016 expansion of the chart ===
The 2015 chart.

The 2015 chart was the greatest expansion of the extIPA since its creation. It was approved by the ICPLA at a conference June 2016. There was no longer an accompanying list of symbols; changes to the chart were as follows:

Consonant table

The consonant table was expanded to accommodate the lateral fricatives [ꞎ] [𝼆] [𝼄], which letters had been in unofficial use, plus a letter for voiced [𝼅] as the voicing diacritic didn't fit well on ꞎ. Adding these letters required the addition of one row for lateral fricatives and two columns for retroflex and palatal places of articulation.

Also added, per community request, were letters for upper pharyngeal plosives, where the root of the tongue contacts the rear wall pharynx without epiglottal involvement. ⟨ꞯ, 𝼂⟩ were chosen.

A velopharyngeal trill [𝼀] was distinguished – a velopharyngeal fricative is often accompanied by uvular trilling, and the trilled and plain fricative variants had not been formally distinguished, with a diacritic such as ⟨ʩ𐞪⟩ being the previous option.

The table was further filled out by adding a voicing distinction with diacritics to existing letters.

The arrangement and labels were also changed: the bidental column was moved to the left of the coronal places, including interdental, between that and dentolabial. The nareal fricative row was renamed nasal fricative per common usage.

Diacritic table

In the diacritic table, the up arrow was removed, as egressive marking was rarely needed, though it might still be useful for marking exhalation in the transcription of conversation.

The four diacritics that were also illustrated in the consonant table were removed from the diacritic table. These were dentolabial, interdental, alveolar and linguolabial. Because this arrangement no longer made it clear that the ◌͇ diacritic simply marked a consonant as alveolar and was not specific to labio-alveolars, the nonsibilant alveolar slit fricatives [θ͇], [ð͇] were added to the alveolar column of the consonant table. It may still be used to disambiguate other alveolar consonants such as [t͇].

The diacritics for an articulatory gesture offset to one side were adopted from the VoQS. They had been included in extIPA before VoQS was split off. The accompanying article clarifies that, by convention, the offset is from the perspective of the transcriber.

The combining parentheses for partial-degree were illustrated on the denasal diacritic to illustrate that they were not restricted to degrees of voicing but could in principle be used with any diacritic. (There is a long extra-IPA history of their use – see Teuthonista.)

Connected-speech and uncertainty table

The table on connected speech absorbed the conventions for marking indeterminacy, silent articulation and extraneous noise and was relabeled 'connected speech, uncertainty etc.'; the cells with notation for pauses and musical terms were consolidated to make room. The illustrations of indeterminate symbols marked by makeshift balloons were cleaned up, with circled Unicode characters replacing the former typewriter hack. These were ○, Ⓒ, Ⓥ, Ⓕ for an indeterminate sound, consonant, vowel and fricative, and ⓟ for 'probably [p].'

'Other' table

The 'other' table was now restricted to symbols for specific sounds, which increased in number: only 4 of the 12 cells carried over from the 2008 chart.

The first new symbols covered a requested distinction between 'apical' and 'bunched' or 'molar' English /r/ for close articulatory description. These articulations are acoustically indistinguishable, so no IPA provision had been made for them; the ICPLA chose apical ⟨ɹ̺⟩ vs centralized ⟨ɹ̈⟩.

For the common articulation of sibilants in speech pathology, with the tongue-tip tucked down behind the lower teeth or gums, it was decided to use the existing diacritic for laminal articulation without overtly marking the lower-dental or -alveolar location.

Next were several examples of superscript letters used to indicate a lateral or lateral-and-median fricative release of plosives, followed by bidental aspiration and the standard-IPA transcription of linguolabial affricates, which are unattested in non-disordered speech.

The ICPLA discovered that the velodorsal symbol ⟨ʞ⟩, introduced in 2008 when it was thought to be obsolete in IPA, was in fact still being used informally as a back-released velar click. To avoid the possibility of confusion the extIPA symbol was changed to reversed ⟨𝼃⟩, and the opportunity was taken to add analogous letters for voiced [𝼁] and nasal [𝼇].

The explanation of [¡] was corrected from 'click' to 'percussive' and 'percussive release'.

By popular request, a convention was provided to transcribe blowing a raspberry. This combined the VoQS symbol for a buccal airstream, [ↀ], with an interdental trill [r̪͆]. The accompanying article suggests that this could be abbreviated to just ⟨ↀ⟩ if it is used often.

=== 2021 chart and copyright release ===
The 2021 chart.

The 2021 chart was motivated primarily to release copyright, which was changed from © to 🅭, 🅯, 🄎.

Several minor improvements were made:

[u͍] was added as an example of labial spreading.

The list of phonetic wildcards was greatly expanded, with conventional letters given for most manners of articulation, σ for 'syllable', and a wildcard illustrated with a diacritic: Ṽ for an indeterminate nasal vowel. The 'probably X' example was changed from [p] in a circle to [n̥ã] in an open oval.

[◌˷] (post-creak) from the 1997 list was added to the chart as an example of the timing of a feature other than voiced and unvoiced.

[◌ʰʰ], [◌ʰ𐞁], the latter recently added to Unicode after a request by the IPA, were illustrated for long aspiration

[(1.3)] was added for a 1.3-second pause.

Abbreviations were suggested for the musical terms cresc(endo) and rall(entando).

⟨ɹ̺⟩ apical-r and ⟨ɹ̈⟩ bunched-r were combined to provide space for [tᶿ kˣ] to illustrate [t, k] with median fricated release, [d𐞞] was added as an example of lateral fricated release, and [d̼͡ð̼] was added as the voiced equivalent of [t̼͡θ̼].

=== 2024 revision and 2025 chart ===
The 2025 chart.

The 2024 revision, with a new chart published in 2025, was largely motivated by the replacement and clarification of three potentially ambiguous diacritics:

- The diacritic for fricative nasal escape was changed from ⟨◌͋⟩ to ⟨◌̾⟩ because the former diacritic could be confused for denasal ⟨◌͊⟩ in poor copy or small type sizes.
- The diacritic for velopharyngeal friction was changed from ⟨◌͌⟩ to ⟨◌𐞐⟩ because a double tilde had been iconically used in standard IPA to indicate intense nasalization without velopharyngeal friction.
- The denasal diacritic was clarified as being partially denasal: a fully denasal [m], for example, would simply be written [b]. [m͊] is specifically a sound between [m] and [b]. Because of this, the illustration of the combining parentheses (a lesser degree of partial denasalization) was removed as potentially confusing.

A couple of minor reversions were also made: The musical terms crescendo and rallentando were again spelled out in full, and the illustration of ⟨tᶿ kˣ⟩ for [t, k] with median fricated release was removed in favor of using that space to restore ⟨ɹ̺⟩ and ⟨ɹ̈⟩ to separate cells.

Typographically, the wildcard for an obstruent was changed from the currency symbol ₵ to the proper Latin letter Ȼ.

The balloon around the example syllable [n̥ã] was closed at top and bottom; this is closer to how the extIPA appears in manuscript but interferes with data storage, as it requires characters for the top and bottom lines to interrupt the transcription. Note that Unicode has refused to provide dedicated support for this uncertainty oval that would not interfere with data storage, as they consider it to be an editorial mark and as such outside the scope of Unicode.

== VoQS ==
The history of the Voice Quality Symbols after its split from extIPA is covered in detail in two JIPA articles, one in 1995 and one in 2018.

== Summary ==
=== Sound values that have been represented by different letters, glyphs or diacritics ===
Consonants
Value	1900	1904	1912	1921	1932	1938	1947	1979	1989	1993
Glottal stop	ʔ	ˀ					ʔ			
Voiceless bilabial fricative	ꜰ				ɸ					
Voiced bilabial fricative	ʋ				β					
Voiced velar fricative	ǥ			ǥ	ɣ					
Voiceless uvular fricative	ᴚ			χ						
Voiceless pharyngeal fricative (or Arabic ح)	ʜ			ħ						
Voiced pharyngeal fricative (or Arabic ع)	ꞯ			ʕ						
Voiceless labial–velar fricative	ʍ			ƕ	ʍ					
Voiced alveolar lateral fricative	—N/a				ɮ	ꜧ			ɮ	
Voiced alveolar fricative trill	—N/a		ř				ɼ		—N/a	
Retroflex consonants	ṭ, ḍ, etc.			𝼪, 𝼥, etc.	ʈ, ɖ, ɳ, ɽ, ʂ, ʐ, ɭ			ʈ, ɖ, ɳ, ɽ, ʂ, ʐ, ɻ, ɭ		
Bilabial click	—N/a							⊙		ʘ
Dental click	—N/a			ʇ					ǀ [short]	ǀ [long]
Alveolar click	—N/a			ʗ					ǃ	
Alveolar lateral click	—N/a			ʖ					ǁ [short]	ǁ [long]
Palatal click	—N/a			ʞ				—N/a	ǂ [short]	ǂ [long]

Vowels
Value	1900	1904	1912	1921	1932	1947	1979	1989	1993	1996
Close-mid back unrounded vowel	ᴀ							ɤ		
Close central unrounded vowel	ï			ɨ	ï, ɨ		ɨ			
Close central rounded vowel	ü			ʉ	ü, ʉ		ʉ			
Close-mid central unrounded vowel	ë			ɘ	ë, ə̝ (Note: Displayed in the charts as ⟨ə˔⟩, with the diacritic adjacent rather than descending.)		—N/a		ɘ	
Close-mid central rounded vowel	ö			ɵ	ö, ɵ		—N/a		ɵ	
Open-mid central unrounded vowel	ä		ɛ̈	ɜ	ɛ̈		—N/a		ɜ	
Open-mid central rounded vowel	ɔ̈			ʚ	ɔ̈		—N/a		ʚ	ɞ
Near-close (near-)front unrounded vowel	ɪ					ɩ	ɩ, ɪ	ɪ		
Near-close (near-)back rounded vowel	ᴜ	ʊ		ᴜ	ʊ	ɷ	ɷ, ʊ	ʊ		

Modifiers
Value	1900	1904	1912	1921	1932	1947	1949	1951	1979	1989	1993	1996	2015	2018
Aspirated	—N/a			◌ʻ, ◌h					◌ʰ					
More rounded	◌˒									◌̹	◌̹, ◌͗			
More spread / less rounded	◌˓									◌̜	◌̜, ◌͑			
Advanced	◌꭫		—N/a			◌˖, ◌̟				◌̟				
Retracted	◌꭪		—N/a			◌˗, ◌̠, ◌ɪ				◌̠				
Raised (vowel)	◌˔			—N/a	◌̣, ◌˔, ◌̝					◌̝				
Raised (consonant)	—N/a								◌̣	◌̝				
Lowered (vowel)	◌˕			—N/a	◌̜, ◌˕, ◌̞					◌̞				
Lowered (consonant)	—N/a								◌̜	◌̞				
Syllabic	◌̗	◌̩									◌̩, ◌̍			
Non-syllabic	◌̆									◌̯	◌̯, ◌̑			
Rhoticity	—N/a					◌ɹ, ◌ʴ, ◌̢			◌ʴ, ◌ʵ, ◌ʶ	◌ ˞		◌˞		
R-coloured [ə]	—N/a					əɹ, əʴ, ɹ, ᶕ		əɹ, əʴ, ɹ, ᶕ, ɚ	ɚ	ə ˞		ə˞	ɚ	
Breathy voice	—N/a						◌h, ◌̒	—N/a	◌̤					
Labialized	—N/a				◌̫					◌ʷ				
Palatalized	—N/a		◌̇	◌̡	◌̡ , ◌̇				◌̡	◌ʲ				
Guttural	—N/a			◌̴						◌̴, ◌ˠ, ◌ˤ				

Suprasegmentals
Value	1900	1904	1912	1921	1932	1947	1949	1951	1979	1989	1993	1996	2015	2018
Primary stress	´				ˈ									
High level	—N/a			ˉ◌, ◌̄						◌́, ◌˦				
Mid level	—N/a			ˉ◌	—N/a					◌̄, ◌˧				
Low level	—N/a			ˍ◌, ◌̠						◌̀, ◌˨				
High rising	—N/a			´◌, ◌́						◌᷄, ◌˦˥		◌᷄, ◌˧˥		
Low rising	—N/a			ˏ◌, ◌̗						◌᷅, ◌˩˨		◌᷅, ◌˩˧		
Rising–falling	—N/a			ˆ◌, ◌̂						◌᷈, ◌˦˥˦			◌᷈, ◌˧˦˧	◌᷈, ◌˧˦˨
Falling–rising	—N/a			ˇ◌, ◌̌						◌᷈, ◌˨˩˨			◌᷈, ◌˧˨˧	◌᷈, ◌˧˨˦

=== Characters that have been given different definitions or descriptions ===
Character	1900	1904	1912	1921	1932	1947	1949	1979	1989	1993
ʀ	Voiced uvular trill	Voiced uvular trill	Voiced uvular trill	Voiced uvular trill	Voiced uvular trill or flap	Voiced uvular trill or flap	Voiced uvular trill or flap	Voiced uvular trill or flap	Voiced uvular trill	Voiced uvular trill
ʜ	Voiceless pharyngeal fricative (or Arabic ح)	Voiceless pharyngeal fricative (or Arabic ح)	Voiceless pharyngeal fricative (or Arabic ح)	Voiceless pharyngeal fricative (or Arabic ح)	—N/a	—N/a	—N/a	—N/a	Voiceless epiglottal fricative	Voiceless epiglottal fricative
ʁ	Voiced uvular fricative	Voiced uvular fricative	Voiced uvular fricative	Voiced uvular fricative	Voiced uvular fricative or approximant	Voiced uvular fricative or approximant	Voiced uvular fricative or approximant	Voiced uvular fricative	Voiced uvular fricative	Voiced uvular fricative
ɹ	Voiced postalveolar fricative or approximant	Voiced postalveolar fricative or approximant	Voiced postalveolar fricative or approximant	Voiced postalveolar fricative or approximant	Voiced postalveolar fricative or approximant	Voiced postalveolar fricative or approximant	Voiced postalveolar fricative or approximant	Postalveolar approximant	Alveolar approximant	Alveolar approximant
ʋ	Voiced bilabial fricative	Voiced bilabial fricative	Voiced bilabial fricative	Voiced bilabial fricative	Voiced bilabial fricative	Labiodental approximant	Labiodental approximant	Labiodental approximant	Labiodental approximant	Labiodental approximant
ɺ	—N/a	—N/a	—N/a	A sound between [r] and [l]	A sound between [r] and [l]	A sound between [r] and [l]	A sound between [d] and [l]	Alveolar lateral flap	Alveolar lateral flap	Alveolar lateral flap
ä	Open-mid central unrounded vowel	Open-mid central unrounded vowel	Open central unrounded vowel	Open central unrounded vowel	Open central unrounded vowel	Open central unrounded vowel	Open central unrounded vowel	Open central unrounded vowel	Centralized open front unrounded vowel	Centralized open front unrounded vowel
ɐ	Near-open central vowel (unroundedness implicit)	Near-open central vowel (unroundedness implicit)	Near-open central vowel (unroundedness implicit)	Near-open central vowel (unroundedness implicit)	Near-open central vowel (unroundedness implicit)	Near-open central vowel (unroundedness implicit)	Near-open central vowel (unroundedness implicit)	Near-open central unrounded vowel	Near-open central unrounded vowel	Near-open central vowel
ə	Mid central vowel (unroundedness implicit)	Mid central vowel (unroundedness implicit)	Mid central vowel (unroundedness implicit)	Mid central vowel (unroundedness implicit)	Mid central vowel (unroundedness implicit)	Mid central vowel (unroundedness implicit)	Mid central vowel (unroundedness implicit)	Mid central unrounded vowel	Mid central unrounded vowel	Mid central vowel
ᴈ/ɜ	—N/a	—N/a	—N/a	Open-mid central unrounded vowel	Variety of [ə]	Variety of [ə]	Variety of [ə]	Variety of [ə]	Variety of [ə]	Open-mid central unrounded vowel
ɵ	—N/a	—N/a	—N/a	Close-mid central rounded vowel	Close-mid central rounded vowel	Close-mid central rounded vowel	Close-mid central rounded vowel	Mid central rounded vowel	Mid central rounded vowel	Close-mid central rounded vowel
ɪ	Near-close front unrounded vowel	Near-close front unrounded vowel	Near-close front unrounded vowel	Near-close front unrounded vowel	Near-close front unrounded vowel	—N/a	—N/a	Near-close near-front unrounded vowel	Near-close near-front unrounded vowel	Near-close near-front unrounded vowel
ʏ	Near-close front rounded vowel	Near-close front rounded vowel	Near-close front rounded vowel	Near-close front rounded vowel	Near-close front rounded vowel	Near-close front rounded vowel	Near-close front rounded vowel	Near-close near-front rounded vowel	Near-close near-front rounded vowel	Near-close near-front rounded vowel
ʊ	—N/a	Near-close back rounded vowel	Near-close back rounded vowel	—N/a	Near-close back rounded vowel	—N/a	—N/a	Near-close near-back rounded vowel	Near-close near-back rounded vowel	Near-close near-back rounded vowel
◌̈	Central	Central	Central	Central	Central	Central	Central	Centralized	Centralized	Centralized
◌̆	Non-syllabic	Non-syllabic	Non-syllabic	Non-syllabic	Non-syllabic	Non-syllabic	Non-syllabic	Non-syllabic	Extra-short	Extra-short
◌́	Tense	Tense	Tense	High rising	High rising	High rising	High rising	High rising	High level	High level
◌̀	Lax	Lax	Lax	High falling	High falling	High falling	High falling	High falling	Low level	Low level
◌̄	—N/a	—N/a	—N/a	High level	High level	High level	High level	High level	Mid level	Mid level
◌̌	—N/a	—N/a	—N/a	Fall-rise	Fall-rise	Fall-rise	Fall-rise	Fall-rise	Rising	Rising
◌̂	—N/a	—N/a	—N/a	Rise-fall	Rise-fall	Rise-fall	Rise-fall	Rise-fall	Falling	Falling
◌̣	Retroflex	Retroflex	Retroflex	—N/a	Raised	Raised	Raised	Raised	—N/a	—N/a

== See also ==
- Obsolete and nonstandard symbols in the International Phonetic Alphabet
- Americanist phonetic notation

== Bibliography ==
- Abercrombie, David (1967). Elements of General Phonetics. Edinburgh University Press.
- Albright, Robert W. (1958). "The International Phonetic Alphabet: Its backgrounds and development". International Journal of American Linguistics. 24 (1). Part III.
- Association phonétique internationale (1895). "vɔt syr l alfabɛ" [Votes sur l'alphabet]. Le Maître Phonétique. 10 (1): 16–17. JSTOR 44707535.
- Association phonétique internationale (1900a). "akt ɔfisjɛl" [Acte officiel]. Le Maître Phonétique. 15 (2–3): 20. JSTOR 44701257.
- Association phonétique internationale (1900b). "Exposé des principes de l'Association phonétique internationale". Le Maître Phonétique. 15 (11). Supplement. JSTOR 44749210.
- Association phonétique internationale (1904). "Aim and Principles of the International Phonetic Association". Le Maître Phonétique. 19 (11). Supplement. JSTOR 44703664.
- Association phonétique internationale (1905). "Exposé des principes de l'Association phonétique internationale". Le Maître Phonétique. 20 (6–7). Supplement. JSTOR 44707887.
- Association phonétique internationale (1908). "Exposé des principes de l'Association phonétique internationale". Le Maître Phonétique. 23 (9–10). Supplement. JSTOR 44707916.
- Association phonétique internationale (1912). "The Principles of the International Phonetic Association". Le Maître Phonétique. 27 (9–10). Supplement. JSTOR 44707964.
- Association phonétique internationale (1921). L'Ecriture phonétique internationale : exposé populaire avec application au français et à plusieurs autres langues (2nd ed.).
- Association phonétique internationale (1927). "desizjɔ̃ dy kɔ̃sɛːj rəlativmɑ̃ o prɔpozisjɔ̃ d la kɔ̃ferɑ̃ːs də *kɔpnag" [Décisions du conseil relativement aux propositions de la conférence de Copenhague]. Le Maître Phonétique. Troisième série. 5 (18): 13–18. JSTOR 44704201.
- Association phonétique internationale (1928). "desizjɔ̃ ofisjɛl" [Décisions officielles]. Le Maître Phonétique. Troisième série. 6 (23): 51–53. JSTOR 44704266.
- Association phonétique internationale (1931). "desizjɔ̃ ofisjɛl" [Décisions officielles]. Le Maître Phonétique. Troisième série. 9 (35): 40–42. JSTOR 44704452.
- Association phonétique internationale (1932). "The International Phonetic Alphabet (revised to 1932)". Le Maître Phonétique. Troisième série. 10 (37). Supplement. JSTOR 44749172. Reprinted in MacMahon (1996), p. 830.
- Association phonétique internationale (1937). "desizjɔ̃ ofisjɛl" [Décisions officielles]. Le Maître Phonétique. Troisième série. 15 (52): 56–57. JSTOR 44704932.
- Association phonétique internationale (1938). "The International Phonetic Alphabet (revised to 1938)". Le Maître Phonétique. Troisième série. 16 (62). Supplement. JSTOR 44748188.
- Association phonétique internationale (1947). "The International Phonetic Alphabet (revised to 1947)". Le Maître Phonétique. Troisième série. 25 (88). Supplement. JSTOR 44748304. Reprinted in Albright (1958), p. 57.
- Association phonétique internationale (1952). "The International Phonetic Alphabet (revised to 1951)". Le Maître Phonétique. Troisième série. 30 (97). Front matter. JSTOR 44748475. Reprinted in MacMahon (2010), p. 270.
- Ball, Martin J.; Howard, Sara J.; Miller, Kirk (2018). "Revisions to the extIPA chart". Journal of the International Phonetic Association. 48 (2): 155–164. doi:10.1017/S0025100317000147. S2CID 151863976.
- Breckwoldt, G. H. (1972). "A Critical Investigation of Click Symbolism" (PDF). In Rigault, André; Charbonneau, René (eds.). Proceedings of the Seventh International Congress of Phonetic Sciences. The Hague and Paris: Mouton. pp. 281–293. doi:10.1515/9783110814750-017. ISBN 9783110814750.
- Catford, J. C. (1977). Fundamental Problems in Phonetics. Edinburgh University Press. ISBN 0-85224-279-4.
- Catford, J. C. (1990). "A proposal concerning central vowels". Journal of the International Phonetic Association. 20 (2): 26–28. doi:10.1017/S0025100300004230. JSTOR 44526804. S2CID 144311902.
- Collins, Beverly; Mees, Inger M. (1998). The Real Professor Higgins: The Life and Career of Daniel Jones. Berlin: Mouton de Gruyter. ISBN 3-11-015124-3.
- Collins, Beverly; Mees, Inger M., eds. (2003). Daniel Jones: Selected Works. Vol. VII: Selected Papers. London: Routledge. ISBN 0-415-23343-7.
- Editors of American Speech (1939). "A Petition". American Speech. 14 (3): 206–208. doi:10.2307/451421. JSTOR 451421.
- Esling, John H. (1995). "News of the IPA". Journal of the International Phonetic Association. 25 (1): 48. doi:10.1017/S0025100300000207. S2CID 144622771.
- Esling, John H. (2010). "Phonetic Notation". In Hardcastle, William J.; Laver, John; Gibbon, Fiona E. (eds.). The Handbook of Phonetic Sciences (2nd ed.). Wiley-Blackwell. pp. 678–702. doi:10.1002/9781444317251.ch18. ISBN 978-1-4051-4590-9.
- Gimson, A. C. (1950). "desizjɔ̃ ofisjɛl" [Décisions officielles]. Le Maître Phonétique. Troisième série. 28 (94): 40–41. JSTOR 44705333.
- Gimson, A. C. (1973). "The Association's Alphabet". Journal of the International Phonetic Association. 3 (2): 60–61. doi:10.1017/S0025100300000773. S2CID 249408229.
- Heitner, Reese M. (2003). "Brackets and slashes, stars and dots: understanding the notation of linguistic types". Language Sciences. 25 (4): 319–330. doi:10.1016/S0388-0001(03)00003-2.
- Henton, Caroline (1988). "5. Individual Symbols and Diacritics". Journal of the International Phonetic Association. 18 (2): 85–94. doi:10.1017/s0025100300003686. JSTOR 44526005.
- Heselwood, Barry (2013). Phonetic Transcription in Theory and Practice. Edinburgh University Press. ISBN 978-0-7486-4073-7.
- International Phonetic Association (1949). "The Principles of the International Phonetic Association". Le Maître Phonétique. Troisième série. 27 (91). Supplement. JSTOR i40200179. Reprinted in Journal of the International Phonetic Association 40 (3), December 2010, pp. 299–358, doi:10.1017/S0025100311000089.
- International Phonetic Association (1978). "The International Phonetic Alphabet (Revised to 1979)". Journal of the International Phonetic Association. 8 (1–2). Supplement. JSTOR 44541414. Reprinted in MacMahon (2010), p. 271.
- International Phonetic Association (1989a). "Report on the 1989 Kiel Convention". Journal of the International Phonetic Association. 19 (2): 67–80. doi:10.1017/S0025100300003868. JSTOR 44526032. S2CID 249412330.
- International Phonetic Association (1989b). "The International Phonetic Alphabet (revised to 1989)". Journal of the International Phonetic Association. 19 (2). Centerfold. doi:10.1017/S002510030000387X. S2CID 249414249.
- International Phonetic Association (1991). "Errata". Journal of the International Phonetic Association. 21 (1). Front matter. doi:10.1017/S0025100300005910. JSTOR 44526087.
- International Phonetic Association (1993a). "Council actions on revisions of the IPA". Journal of the International Phonetic Association. 23 (1): 32–34. doi:10.1017/S002510030000476X. S2CID 249420050.
- International Phonetic Association (1993b). "The International Phonetic Alphabet (revised to 1993)". Journal of the International Phonetic Association. 23 (1). Center pages. doi:10.1017/S0025100300004746. S2CID 242001518. Reprinted in MacMahon (1996), p. 822.
- International Phonetic Association (1999). Handbook of the International Phonetic Association: A Guide to the Use of the International Phonetic Alphabet. Cambridge University Press. ISBN 0-521-63751-1.
- International Phonetic Association (1 July 2012). "IPA Chart now under a Creative Commons Licence".
- International Phonetic Association (2016). "Full IPA Chart". Archived from the original on 5 March 2016.
- International Phonetic Association (2018). "IPA charts and sub-charts in four fonts". Archived from the original on 24 May 2018.
- International Phonetic Association (2020). "IPA charts and sub-charts in four fonts".
- International Phonetic Association (5 December 2025). "Call for proposals to host the 2029 IPA Convention".
- Jespersen, Otto; Pedersen, Holger (1926). Phonetic Transcription and Transliteration: Proposals of the Copenhagen Conference, April 1925. Oxford University Press.
- Jones, Daniel (1928). "Das System der Association Phonétique Internationale (Weltlautschriftverein)". In Heepe, Martin (ed.). Lautzeichen und ihre Anwendung in verschiedenen Sprachgebieten. Berlin: Reichsdruckerei. pp. 18–27. Reprinted in Le Maître Phonétique 3, 6 (23), July–September 1928, JSTOR 44704262. Reprinted in Collins & Mees (2003).
- Jones, Daniel (1938). "desizjɔ̃ ofisjɛl" [Décisions officielles]. Le Maître Phonétique. Troisième série. 16 (61): 14–15. JSTOR 44704878.
- Jones, Daniel (1943). "desizjɔ̃ ofisjɛl" [Décisions officielles]. Le Maître Phonétique. Troisième série. 21 (80): 27–28. JSTOR 44705153.
- Jones, Daniel (1945). "desizjɔ̃ ofisjɛl" [Décisions officielles]. Le Maître Phonétique. Troisième série. 23 (83): 11–17. JSTOR 44705184.
- Jones, Daniel (1948). "desizjɔ̃ ofisjɛl" [Décisions officielles]. Le Maître Phonétique. Troisième série. 26 (90): 28–31. JSTOR 44705217.
- Jones, Daniel (1956). Cardinal Vowels Spoken by Daniel Jones: Text of Records with Explanatory Notes by Professor Jones (PDF). London: Linguaphone Institute.
- Jones, Daniel; Camilli, Amerindo (1933). "Fondamenti di grafia fonetica secondo il sistema dell'Associazione fonetica internazionale". Le Maître Phonétique. Troisième série. 11 (43). Supplement. JSTOR 44704558. Reprinted in Collins & Mees (2003).
- Jones, Daniel; Dahl, Ivar (1944). "Fundamentos de escritura fonética según el sistema de la Asociación Fonética Internacional". Le Maître Phonétique. Troisième série. 22 (82). Supplement. Reprinted in Collins & Mees (2003).
- Jones, Daniel; Ward, Dennis (1969). The Phonetics of Russian. Cambridge University Press.
- Keating, Patricia (2012). "IPA Council votes against new IPA symbol". Journal of the International Phonetic Association. 42 (2): 245. doi:10.1017/S0025100312000114.
- Keating, Patricia (20 February 2016). "New versions of IPA chart - 3 different fonts". International Phonetic Association.
- Keating, Patricia (14 June 2017). "IPA Council establishes new committees". International Phonetic Association.
- Keating, Patricia (18 May 2018). "2018 IPA charts now posted online". International Phonetic Association.
- Kemp, Alan (2006). "Phonetic Transcription: History". In Brown, Keith (ed.). Encyclopedia of Language and Linguistics. Vol. 9 (2nd ed.). Amsterdam: Elsevier. pp. 396–410. doi:10.1016/B0-08-044854-2/00015-8. ISBN 978-0-08-044854-1.
- Kelly, John (1981). "The 1847 Alphabet: an Episode of Phonotypy". In Asher, R. E.; Henderson, Eugene J. A. (eds.). Towards a History of Phonetics. Edinburgh University Press. pp. 248–264. ISBN 0-85224-374-X.
- Kenyon, John S. (1951). "Need of a uniform phonetic alphabet". Quarterly Journal of Speech. 37 (3): 311–320. doi:10.1080/00335635109381671.
- Köhler, Oswin; Ladefoged, Peter; Snyman, Jan; Traill, Anthony; Vossen, Rainer (1988). "The symbols for clicks". Journal of the International Phonetic Association. 18 (2): 140–142. doi:10.1017/S0025100300003741. S2CID 146319702.
- Ladefoged, Peter (1987a). "Updating the Theory". Journal of the International Phonetic Association. 17 (1): 10–14. doi:10.1017/S0025100300003170. S2CID 145197852.
- Ladefoged, Peter (1987b). "Proposed revision of the International Phonetic Alphabet: A conference". Journal of the International Phonetic Association. 17 (1): 34. doi:10.1017/S0025100300003224. S2CID 143715325.
- Ladefoged, Peter; Roach, Peter (1986). "Revising the International Phonetic Alphabet: A plan". Journal of the International Phonetic Association. 16 (1): 22–29. doi:10.1017/S0025100300003078. S2CID 143609570.
- Lepsius, R. (1855). Standard Alphabet for Reducing Unwritten Languages and Foreign Graphic Systems to a Uniform Orthography in European Letters. London: Seeleys.
- MacMahon, Michael K. C. (1986). "The International Phonetic Association: The first 100 years". Journal of the International Phonetic Association. 16 (1): 30–38. doi:10.1017/S002510030000308X. S2CID 145576661.
- MacMahon, Michael K. C. (1996). "Phonetic Notation". In Daniels, Peter T.; Bright, William (eds.). The World's Writing Systems. Oxford University Press. pp. 821–846. ISBN 0-19-507993-0.
- MacMahon, Michael K. C. (2010). "The International Phonetic Alphabet". In Malmkjaer, Kirsten (ed.). The Routledge Linguistics Encyclopedia (3rd ed.). Routledge. pp. 269–275. ISBN 978-0-415-42104-1.
- McClure, J. Derrick (1972). "A suggested revision for the Cardinal Vowel system". Journal of the International Phonetic Association. 2 (1): 20–25. doi:10.1017/S0025100300000402. S2CID 145752394.
- Nicolaidis, Katerina (2005). "Approval of new IPA sound: the labiodental flap". Journal of the International Phonetic Association. 35 (2): 261. doi:10.1017/S0025100305002227. S2CID 232350099.
- Passy, Paul (1909). "desizjɔ̃ː dy kɔ̃ːsɛːj" [Décisions du conseil]. Le Maître Phonétique. 24 (5–6): 74–76. JSTOR 44700643.
- Phonetic Teachers' Association (1887a). "lernərz kornər" [Learners' corner]. The Phonetic Teacher. 2 (13): 5–8. JSTOR 44706347.
- Phonetic Teachers' Association (1887b). "lernərz kornər" [Learners' corner]. The Phonetic Teacher. 2 (19): 46–48. JSTOR 44706366.
- Phonetic Teachers' Association (1888a). "aur alfəbits" [Our alphabets]. The Phonetic Teacher. 3 (5): 34–35. JSTOR 44707197.
- Phonetic Teachers' Association (1888b). "aur rivàizd ælfəbit" [Our revised alphabet]. The Phonetic Teacher. 3 (7–8): 57–60. JSTOR 44701189.
- Pullum, Geoffrey K.; Ladusaw, William A. (2013) [1996]. Phonetic Symbol Guide (2nd ed.). University of Chicago Press. ISBN 978-0-226-92488-5.
- Sweet, Henry (1902). A Primer of Phonetics (2nd ed.). Oxford University Press.
- Trofimov, M. V.; Jones, Daniel (1923). The Pronunciation of Russian. Cambridge University Press. Reprinted in Collins, Beverly; Mees, Inger M., eds. (2003), Daniel Jones: Selected Works, Volume V: European Languages II – Russian, London: Routledge, ISBN 0-415-23341-0.
- Viëtor, Wilhelm (1901). "ʔɛkspeˈrimɛnʹtɛlə ʔərʹgeːpnısə". Le Maître Phonétique. 16 (4–5): 60. JSTOR 44703555.
- Wells, John C. (1975). "The Association's alphabet". Journal of the International Phonetic Association. 5 (2): 52–58. doi:10.1017/S0025100300001274. S2CID 249411014.
- Wells, John C. (1976). "The Association's Alphabet". Journal of the International Phonetic Association. 6 (1): 2–3. doi:10.1017/S0025100300001420. S2CID 249403800.
- Wells, John C. (6 November 2006). "Scenes from IPA history". John Wells's phonetic blog. Department of Phonetics and Linguistics, University College London.
- Whitley, M. Stanley (2003). "Rhotic representation: problems and proposals". Journal of the International Phonetic Association. 23 (1): 81–86. doi:10.1017/S0025100303001166. S2CID 145538124.

Place →	Labial					Coronal										Dorsal					Laryngeal			
Manner ↓	Bilabial		Labiodental		Linguolabial		Dental		Alveolar		Postalveolar		Retroflex		(Alveolo-)palatal		Velar		Uvular		Pharyngeal/epiglottal		Glottal	
Nasal	m̥	m	ɱ̊	ɱ		n̼	n̪̊	n̪	n̥	n	n̠̊	n̠	ɳ̊	ɳ	ɲ̊	ɲ	ŋ̊	ŋ	ɴ̥	ɴ				
Plosive	p	b	p̪	b̪	t̼	d̼	t̪	d̪	t	d			ʈ	ɖ	c	ɟ	k	ɡ	q	ɢ	ʡ		ʔ	
Sibilant affricate							t̪s̪	d̪z̪	ts	dz	t̠ʃ	d̠ʒ	tʂ	dʐ	tɕ	dʑ								
Non-sibilant affricate	pɸ	bβ	p̪f	b̪v			t̪θ	d̪ð	tɹ̝̊	dɹ̝	t̠ɹ̠̊˔	d̠ɹ̠˔			cç	ɟʝ	kx	ɡɣ	qχ	ɢʁ	ʡʜ	ʡʢ	ʔh	
Sibilant fricative							s̪	z̪	s	z	ʃ	ʒ	ʂ	ʐ	ɕ	ʑ								
Non-sibilant fricative	ɸ	β	f	v	θ̼	ð̼	θ	ð	θ̠	ð̠	ɹ̠̊˔	ɹ̠˔	ɻ̊˔	ɻ˔	ç	ʝ	x	ɣ	χ	ʁ	ħ	ʕ	h	ɦ
Approximant		β̞		ʋ				ð̞		ɹ		ɹ̠		ɻ		j		ɰ						˷
Tap/flap		ⱱ̟		ⱱ					ɾ̥	ɾ			ɽ̊	ɽ						ɢ̆		ʡ̆		
Trill	ʙ̥	ʙ							r̥	r		r̠	ɽ̊r̥	ɽr					ʀ̥	ʀ	ʜ	ʢ		
Lateral affricate									tɬ	dɮ			tꞎ	d𝼅	c𝼆	ɟʎ̝	k𝼄	ɡʟ̝						
Lateral fricative							ɬ̪		ɬ	ɮ			ꞎ	𝼅	𝼆	ʎ̝	𝼄	ʟ̝						
Lateral approximant								l̪	l̥	l		l̠	ɭ̊	ɭ	ʎ̥	ʎ	ʟ̥	ʟ		ʟ̠				
Lateral tap/flap									ɺ̥	ɺ			𝼈̊	𝼈		ʎ̆		ʟ̆						

		BL	LD	D	A	PA	RF	P	V	U
Implosive	Voiced	ɓ			ɗ		ᶑ	ʄ	ɠ	ʛ
Implosive	Voiceless	ɓ̥			ɗ̥		ᶑ̊	ʄ̊	ɠ̊	ʛ̥
Ejective	Stop	pʼ			tʼ		ʈʼ	cʼ	kʼ	qʼ
Ejective	Affricate		p̪fʼ	tθʼ	tsʼ	tʃʼ	tʂʼ	tɕʼ	kxʼ	qχʼ
Ejective	Fricative	ɸʼ	fʼ	θʼ	sʼ	ʃʼ	ʂʼ	ɕʼ	xʼ	χʼ
Ejective	Lateral affricate				tɬʼ			c𝼆ʼ	k𝼄ʼ	q𝼄ʼ
Ejective	Lateral fricative				ɬʼ					
Click (top: velar; bottom: uvular)	Tenuis	kʘ qʘ		kǀ qǀ	kǃ qǃ		k𝼊 q𝼊	kǂ qǂ		
Click (top: velar; bottom: uvular)	Voiced	ɡʘ ɢʘ		ɡǀ ɢǀ	ɡǃ ɢǃ		ɡ𝼊 ɢ𝼊	ɡǂ ɢǂ		
Click (top: velar; bottom: uvular)	Nasal	ŋʘ ɴʘ		ŋǀ ɴǀ	ŋǃ ɴǃ		ŋ𝼊 ɴ𝼊	ŋǂ ɴǂ	ʞ	
Click (top: velar; bottom: uvular)	Tenuis lateral				kǁ qǁ					
Click (top: velar; bottom: uvular)	Voiced lateral				ɡǁ ɢǁ					
Click (top: velar; bottom: uvular)	Nasal lateral				ŋǁ ɴǁ					
