= Phonetic Symbol Guide =

Book on phonetic transcription symbols

- Cover of the second edition
- Author: Geoffrey Pullum; William Ladusaw
- Subject: Linguistics
- Genre: Non-fiction
- Publisher: University of Chicago Press
- Publication date: 1986 (1st edition); July 30, 1996 (2nd edition, print); February 22, 2013 (2nd edition, e-book)
- Media type: Print; Clothbound; Paperback; Digital
- Pages: 266 (1st edition); 358 (2nd edition)
- ISBN: 978-0-226-68531-1

The Phonetic Symbol Guide is a book by Geoffrey Pullum and William Ladusaw that explains the histories and uses of the symbols of various phonetic transcription conventions. It was published in 1986, with a second edition in 1996, by the University of Chicago Press. Symbols include letters and diacritics of the International Phonetic Alphabet and Americanist phonetic notation, though not of the Uralic Phonetic Alphabet. The Guide was consulted by the International Phonetic Association when they established names and numerical codes for the International Phonetic Alphabet and was the basis for the characters of the TIPA set of phonetic fonts.

== List of symbols ==
The symbols included in the 2nd edition of the Guide are as follows. A number were adopted into Unicode 14 and 15 and have been available in SIL fonts since February 2023. Those not found in Unicode are marked with a leading asterisk.

Type	Form	Entries
Letters	A	a ȧ ä ᶏ ɐ ɑ α ɒ ɒ̇ ɒ̈ ꭤ æ æ̇ æ̈ ꜵ ᴀ A 4 ꜭ * Æ * ʌ *
Letters	B	b ḅ ƀ b̶ b̸ ь ъ ɓ ʙ β
Letters	C	c ć ꞓ ȼ č ç ƈ ɕ ʗ 𝼏 C
Letters	D	d đ d̶ d̸ 𝼥 ɗ ɖ ᶑ ȸ ʣ ʤ ð δ D
Letters	E	e ë ę ᶒ ə ɚ ɘ ᴇ ᴇ̈ E ɛ ɛ̇ ᶓ ʚ ɜ ɝ ɞ
Letters	F	f ƒ ꜰ
Letters	G	ɡ ɡ̶ ǥ ɠ g ɢ ʛ G ɣ γ * * ɤ (~ *)
Letters	H	h ḥ ƕ ħ ɦ * ꜧ ɧ ɥ ʮ ʯ ʜ H
Letters	I	i ï ı ɨ ɪ ɪ̈ ᵻ I ι ɿ ʅ
Letters	J	j * ɉ ʝ ǰ ɟ ʄ ᴊ
Letters	K	k ꝁ ƙ ʞ ᴋ 𝼐
Letters	L	l ɫ ƚ ɬ ɭ ɮ (~ *) ʟ L *ʟ λ ƛ
Letters	M	m ɱ * ɯ ɰ ᴍ M
Letters	N	n ń * π ƞ ñ ɲ ŋ η ɳ ɴ N
Letters	O	o ȯ ö ǫ ƍ σ O ♀ ⚲ ʘ ɵ θ ø * (~ ∅) ɸ œ ɶ ꝏ 8 ɔ ɔ̇ ɔ̈ * ᶗ ꭢ ω ω̇ ω̈ * ɷ ꭥ ꭥ̇ ꭥ̈ *
Letters	P	p ᵽ ƥ *ɋ ᴘ P ρ ƿ þ
Letters	Q	q ʠ ȹ
Letters	R	r ɾ ɼ ɽ ɹ ɻ ɺ ʀ R ᴙ ʁ
Letters	S	s S š ʂ ʃ 𝼋 ƪ ʆ 𝼌
Letters	T	t ŧ 𝼪 ƫ ʈ ƭ ʇ 𝼍 ʦ ʧ
Letters	U	u u̇ ü ʉ * ꞹ ʊ ᴜ ᴜ̇ ᵾ * U
Letters	V	v ʋ
Letters	W	w ◌̫ ẇ ẅ w̸ ʍ
Letters	X	x x̭ x̯ X χ
Letters	Y	y ÿ ʎ ʏ
Letters	Z	z ȥ ž ʑ ʐ ƻ ↊ ʒ ǯ ƺ ʓ ƹ ↋
Letters	Ɂ	ʔ ? 7 ʡ ʖ ƾ 𝼎 ʕ 9 ʢ
Letters	Click	ǃ ǀ / ǂ ≠ ǁ ⫽ ⫻ # & *
Letters	Chao tone	˩ ˨ ˧ ˦ ˥ etc.
Diacritics	Tone	◌́ ◌̄ ◌̀ ◌̌ ◌̂ ◌᷉ etc.
Diacritics	Math-like	◌̄ ˉ ˗ − ◌̠ ˍ + ◌̟ ◌̽ ˭
Diacritics	Box-like	◌̪ ◌̺ ◌̻ ◌̝ ˔ ◌̞ ˕ ◌꭪ ◌꭫
Diacritics	Stress	ˈ ˌ ◌̩ ◌̚
Diacritics	Arrow-like	↑ ↓ ↗ ↘ ˂ ˃ ◌͕ * ⃖
Diacritics	Dot-like	◌̇ ꞏ . ˑ ◌̣ ◌̈ ◌̤ ꞉ ː
Diacritics	Comma-like	ʼ ʽ ʻ , ⹁
Diacritics	Ring	◌̊ ◌̥ ◌̜ ˒ ◌̹
Diacritics	Wavy	◌̃ ◌̴ ◌̰ ◌̼
Diacritics	Accent	◌́ ˊ ◌̀ ˋ ◌̂ ◌̭ ◌̌ ◌̬
Diacritics	Hook	◌̨ ◌̧ ◌̡ ◌˞ ◌̢
Diacritics	Breve	◌̆ ◌̑ ◌̯ ◌͡◌ ◌͜◌

The TIPA character set covers many of the symbols in the Phonetic Symbol Guide, including some that are not supported by Unicode

== Symbols not in Unicode ==
=== Non-trivial Unicode support ===
Not all Unicode support is direct. Some typewriter substitutions made by overstriking a Latin letter with a virgule require composite encoding:

- ⟨b̸⟩, for a voiced bilabial fricative [β]
- ⟨d̸⟩, for a voiced dental fricative [ð]
- ⟨w̸⟩, for a labially compressed velar approximant [ɰᵝ] (suggested for some dialects of Nahuatl)

Similarly ⟨ꭥ̶⟩, an unused proposal to replace Americanist ⟨ꭥ̇⟩ [ɵ̞].

The 'baby gamma' variant ⟨⟩ of the vowel letter ⟨ɤ⟩ is available as a character variant in fonts such as Gentium and Andika. Similarly, ⟨⟩ (⟨ǥ⟩ with the stroke slanted through the descender) for a voiced velar fricative [ɣ] is likewise font-dependent for accurate display.

Several other symbols are graphic variants of Unicode characters:

- p with a tail facing left ( ɋ) and reversed o with ogonek (ǫ). The first is an allograph in Doke of ⟨ƍ⟩ (turned delta δ), and the latter a misanalysis by the Guide of the same letter.
- double virgule ⫽, a close-kerned // or italicized ǁ, is an allograph of ⟨ǁ⟩. It might be adequately rendered with U+2AFD ⫽ DOUBLE SOLIDUS OPERATOR.
- triple virgule ⫻, a close-kerned /// or italicized ⦀, used in a passing mention of retroflex clicks in the Cole article "Bushman Languages" in the 1966 Encyclopædia Britannica (4: 469). The symbol was removed from later editions. It might be adequately rendered with U+2AFB ⫻ TRIPLE SOLIDUS BINARY RELATION. This is an allograph of a triple pipe, for which Unicode recommends using character U+2980 TRIPLE VERTICAL BAR DELIMITER ⟨⦀⟩.

Smalley's hooktop j for [ʄ].

A couple are more distinct graphically, but without a corresponding semantic distinction:

- superscript spacing diacritic ⟨^{←}⟩, used to indicate clicks in Smalley (1963). This is similar to the subscript arrow U+02FF (˿) used to indicate clicks in the same way in the Uralic Phonetic Alphabet. It might be hacked as a non-breaking space plus U+20D6: ⟨ ⃖⟩.
- hooktop j, an Americanist variant of ⟨ ʄ ⟩ in Smalley (1963) Manual of Articulatory Phonetics. Unlike ⟨ ʄ ⟩, in the Smalley letter the hook connects to the dot of the jay and so is detached from the body of the letter.

=== Rare symbols ===
The following are not supported by Unicode as of version 18.

Some of the symbols are idiosyncratic proposals by well-known scholars that never caught on:

A couple symbols were mentioned in the 1949 Principles of the International Phonetic Association as "recent suggestions" for further improvement but were never adopted:

- h-m ligature, approx. ⟨m⟩ or ⟨ɰ⟩ (turned ⟨ɰ⟩:) for [m̥]
- turned small capital U ⟨ᴜ⟩ for a generic vowel; ⟨V⟩ is now generally used.

⟨ɳ⟩, a right-tail hooktop h (fusion of ⟨ɦ⟩ and ⟨ɳ ⟩:), found for a velar fricative in the Germanic 'fortis' voiceless spirant series [f þ ɳ], contrasting with the voiced series [ƀ ð ᵹ] and the Indo-European 'lenis' spirants [ɸ θ χ] in Prokosch (1939) A Comparative Germanic Grammar (particularly pp. 50–51). Prokosch describes the symbol as a "modified h, since h is the usual spelling in all Germanic languages" (p. 83), though other authors simply write these sounds [f þ h]. The Guide notes that the letter only appears in italic font, and suggests that it may simply be an italic ⟨ɦ⟩ with an exaggerated right leg, similar to italic ⟨f⟩ ( ƒ ) in many fonts. Some fonts such as Helvetica incorrectly display ⟨ɧ⟩ with this form.

The majority of the non-Unicode symbols were proposed by George Trager to improve the Bloch & Trager system of vowel transcription and other conventions of Americanist notation, but were never adopted:

- inverted (turned) small capital ᴀ ⟨ᴀ⟩ to replace ⟨æ̇⟩ [ɜ̞]; this had been the original IPA form of the letter that is now ⟨ɤ⟩.
- small capital Ꜵ ligature ⟨Ꜵ⟩ (resembles an ⟨ᴀ-ᴅ⟩ ligature in guide:) to replace ⟨ɒ̈⟩ [ɶ]
- small capital Δ ⟨Δ⟩ to replace ⟨ᴇ̈⟩ [ɤ̞]
- barred ɔ ⟨ꞓ⟩ (reversed ⟨ꞓ⟩) to replace ⟨ɔ̇⟩ [ɞ]
- inverted (turned) ω ⟨ω⟩ to replace ⟨ω̇⟩ [ɞ̞]
- u with a bar on the left leg ⟨- ⟩ to replace ⟨u̇⟩ [ʉ]

Consonants proposed by Trager:

- fusion of ᴛ + n (n with the arm of ᴛ to the left:), approx. ⟨ n⟩ for the dental nasal [n̪]. It is similar in shape to U+1DF27 𝼧 LATIN SMALL LETTER N WITH MID-HEIGHT LEFT HOOK, though with a flat left arm.
- reversed small capital L ⟨ʟ⟩ (turned ᴦ or small-cap ⅃) for a labial lateral approximant; this is not a distinctive sound and the symbol was never used. However, it would potentially be used for a velodorsal lateral in extIPA, analogous to the other velodorsals ⟨𝼃 𝼁 𝼇⟩ which are likewise reversed variants of their derivative velar letters ⟨k ɡ ŋ⟩.
- 'front-tail' (left-swinging) gamma ⟨⟩ (approx. ⟨γ̡⟩); noted in the guide as a 'prevelar slit spirant' or voiced fronted velar fricative [ɣ᫈]. This symbol is found in other traditions.
- 'back-tail' (right-swinging) gamma ⟨⟩ (approx. ⟨γ̢⟩); noted in the guide as a 'postvelar slit spirant' or voiced uvular fricative [ʁ]. This symbol is found in other traditions.

==== Gallery ====
The proposed turned small-cap A for ⟨æ̇⟩ [ɜ̞]; old IPA for ⟨ɤ⟩.

The proposed small-cap A-O ligature for ⟨ɒ̈⟩ [ɶ].

The proposed small-cap delta for ⟨ᴇ̈⟩ [ɤ̞].

The proposed ɔ-bar for ⟨ɔ̇⟩ [ɞ].

Left-hook ('front-tail') gamma for [ɣ᫈].

Right-hook ('back-tail') gamma for [ɣ᫢].

The h-m ligature for [m̥].

Prokosch's right-tail hooktop h, assuming the tail is inherent.

The proposed letter for [n̪].

The proposed half-barred u for ⟨u̇⟩ [ʉ].

The proposed turned small-cap U for [V].

The proposed turned omega for ⟨ω̇⟩ [ɞ̞].

== Bibliography ==
- Pullum, Geoffrey K.; Ladusaw, William A. (2013) [1996]. Phonetic Symbol Guide (2nd ed.). University of Chicago Press. ISBN 978-0-226-92488-5.

== See also ==
- Obsolete and nonstandard symbols in the International Phonetic Alphabet
