= William Ladusaw =

American linguist

William Ladusaw is an American linguist and professor emeritus of linguistics at the University of California, Santa Cruz, where he also served as the dean of the Division of Humanities prior to his retirement. Ladusaw's work concerns formal semantics, the syntax-semantics interface, and polarity.
