= Sulcalization =

Phonetic feature

In articulatory phonetics, sulcalization (from Latin: sulcus 'groove') is the pronunciation of a sound with a deep, longitudinal concavity (groove) down the back of the tongue (the dorsum), roughly opposite of the uvula.

== Articulatory mechanism ==
Sulcalization is accomplished by raising the sides of the dorsum, leaving a hollow along the midline.

Some linguists extend the term sulcalization to refer more broadly to the general presence of a longitudinal concavity along the tongue midline, rather than being strictly posterior (see § Grooved fricatives). In this sense, sulcalization is the functional inverse of lateralization: sulcalization raises the sides of the tongue to direct airflow along the midline, whereas lateralization lowers the sides of the tongue to direct airflow over the sides (blocking airflow along the midline).

However, this contrast does not necessitate mutual exclusivity; for example, a "dark l" [ɫ] may involve posterior dorsal sulcalization, alongside its characteristic anterior coronal lateralization.

== Occurrence ==
Sulcalization has typically been associated with rhotics such as a 'bunched' or 'molar' r [ɹ̈] and r-colored vowels, as well as 'dark' or 'throaty' quality sounds, either more velar-like (such as [ɫ]) or more pharyngeal-like (such as [ɒ]).

=== Vowel quality ===
No spoken language is known to make a phonemic distinction between sulcalized and ordinary vowels. However, it has been reported that for some speakers of Received Pronunciation (RP), the vowel /ɒ/, which is normally described as rounded, is pronounced with neutral or spread lips, and is instead given its characteristic quality through a "hollowing or sulcalization of the tongue-body".

One scholar has also suggested that the vowel in the RP pronunciation of words like bird, typically transcribed /ɜː/, is actually a sulcal schwa, retaining the sulcality of the original rhotic consonant. Accordingly, the realization of the /ə/-element of the centring diphthongs /ɪə̯/, /ʊə̯/, /ɛə̯/ in words such as near, pure and scare, is interpreted as the product of a loss of sulcality. Similarly to the case of RP /ɜː/, it has been noted that the rhotacized equivalent /ɝ/ in American English is strongly sulcalized.

== Representation ==
The International Phonetic Alphabet does not have a symbol to denote the sulcalization of a consonant or vowel, as the process is typically concomitant with other more prominent features, and may never be used as the sole distinctive feature that separates two sounds. At the 1989 Kiel Convention, it was considered whether to introduce a symbolization for sulcality distinct from that used for rhoticity, but this was voted against. In preliminary voting prior to the conference, the symbol ⟨ᵿ˞⟩ was also proposed to represent a "back sulcal vowel" specifically, though this too was rejected.

== Grooved fricatives ==
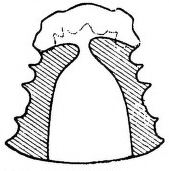
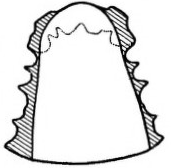
Palatograms of [s], which is grooved, and [θ], which is slit

Some linguists have referred to grooved fricatives, a similar but distinct articulatory concept, as sulcalized, though this should not be confused with the more common definition described in the preceding sections. (Note: Ladefoged & Maddieson (1996), p. 367 collapse the two concepts, despite the majority of other linguists using them in different phonological and phonetic contexts; this includes Catford (1982) [1977], their primary reference for their description. Catford refers to the two concepts in different sections of his work, and does not treat them as synonymous.) As with the more common definition of sulcalization, grooved fricatives also involve forming a groove down the center of the tongue (such as in the typical realization of /s/ in the English words sit and case). They contrast with slit fricatives, which are pronounced with the tongue flat.

=== Distinction ===
The grooved–slit distinction primarily applies to anterior consonants. Unlike the more common definition of sulcalization, which typically refers to a posterior hollowing (in the dorsal region), grooved fricatives involve raising the sides of the tongue to focus the turbulent airstream on the teeth, producing an anterior hollowing (in the coronal region). This results in a more intense sound, typically associated with sibilants. Slit fricatives, with a flatter shape, have a wider and more dispersed airflow channel.

=== Phonetic status ===
J. C. Catford observed that the degree of tongue grooving differs between places of articulation as well as between languages; however, no language is known to phonemically contrast fricatives based purely on the presence or absence of tongue grooving. Nonetheless, linguists sometimes make a phonetic distinction for certain fricative allophones that occur at the same place of articulation as a grooved or slit counterpart.

For example, [t̞] (a lenited allophone of /t/ found in some English dialects) is commonly described as slit, to distinguish it from grooved [s]; though it has also been noted that additional articulatory factors may go into the distinction between grooved [s] and slit [t̞], such as a difference of apical and laminal articulation.

Historically, the terms grooved fricative and sibilant have sometimes been used synonymously (and by extension, slit fricative and non-sibilant), though the reality of sibilant shapes is more complex; not all sibilants share this feature, nor is it necessarily unique to sibilants. For instance, /ʃ/ is widely regarded to be characterized by a convex doming of the tongue rather than a concave grooving, and therefore has been defined as slit; conversely, ultrasound imaging has shown /θ/ in English to exhibit grooving similar to /s/, despite being typically regarded as slit.

=== Transcription practices ===
It was once proposed for the IPA to include a diacritic to distinguish grooved and slit fricatives, but the proposal was rejected. While lacking diacritics for the feature specifically, the extIPA chart includes [θ͇] and [ð͇] to denote slit alveolar fricatives, which the authors have noted form a contrastive graphical pair with the more commonly seen [s̪] and [z̪], denoting grooved dental fricatives. (Note: The authors also note that the transcriptions [θ̠] and [ð̠] have been used for the slit alveolar fricatives (e.g. Ladefoged & Maddieson (1996), p. 145), but that the alveolar diacritic ⟨◌͇⟩ is preferable to the retracted diacritic ⟨◌̠⟩, as it pairs with the dental diacritic ⟨◌̪⟩ in denoting a more precise place of articulation rather than a relative one.)

== See also ==
- Assibilation
- Tongue rolling

== Bibliography ==
- Attinasi, John J. (1975). "Varieties of English/Spanish Language Contact in New York". Bilingual Review / La Revista Bilingüe. 2 (3): 296–311. JSTOR 25743650.
- Ball, Martin J.; Howard, Sara J.; Miller, Kirk (2018). "Revisions to the extIPA chart". Journal of the International Phonetic Association. 48 (2): 155–164. doi:10.1017/S0025100317000147. JSTOR 26502601. S2CID 151863976.
- Bernhardt, Barbara; Ball, Martin J. (1993). "Characteristics of Atypical Speech Currently Not Included in the Extensions to the IPA". Journal of the International Phonetic Association. 23 (1): 35–38. JSTOR 44594812.
- Catford, J. C. (1982) [1977]. Fundamental Problems in Phonetics. Indiana University Press. ISBN 0-85224-437-1.
- Catford, J. C. (1994) [1988]. A Practical Introduction to Phonetics (Reprinted 1st ed.). Oxford University Press. ISBN 978-0198242178.
- Catford, J. C. (2001). "On Rs, Rhotacism and Paleophony". Journal of the International Phonetic Association. 31 (2): 171–185. JSTOR 44645159.
- Catford, John C.; Esling, John H. (2006). "Articulatory Phonetics". In Brown, Keith (ed.). Encyclopedia of Language & Linguistics (2nd ed.). Elsevier. pp. 425–442. doi:10.1016/B0-08-044854-2/00002-X. ISBN 9780080448541.
- Clarke, Sandra (2009) [2005]. "The Legacy of British and Irish English in Newfoundland". In Hickey, Raymond (ed.). Legacies of Colonial English. Studies in English Language. pp. 242–261. doi:10.1017/CBO9780511486920. ISBN 9780521830201.
- Erickson, Blaine (2003). "On the development of English r". In Minkova, Donka; Stockwell, Robert (eds.). Studies in the History of the English Language: A Millennial Perspective. Walter de Gruyter. pp. 183–206. doi:10.1515/9783110197143.2.183. ISBN 978-3-11-017368-0.
- Henton, Caroline (1988). "5. Individual Symbols and Diacritics". Journal of the International Phonetic Association. 18 (2): 85–94. doi:10.1017/s0025100300003686. JSTOR 44526005.
- Jones, Daniel (1976) [1967]. The phoneme: its nature and use (3rd ed.). Cambridge University Press. ISBN 9780521213516.
- Gimson, A. C. (1973a). "The Association's Alphabet". Journal of the International Phonetic Association. 3 (1): 2–3. JSTOR 44525759.
- Gimson, A. C. (1973b). "The Association's Alphabet". Journal of the International Phonetic Association. 3 (2): 60–61. JSTOR 44525774.
- King, Hannah (2020). Seeing is perceiving: The role of the lips in the production and perception of Anglo-English /r/ (PDF) (Thesis). Université de Paris.
- Lass, Roger (1984). Phonology: an introduction to basic concepts. Cambridge University Press. ISBN 9780521237284.
- Ladefoged, Peter; Maddieson, Ian (1996). The Sounds of the World's Languages. Oxford: Blackwell. ISBN 0-631-19815-6.
- Lowman, G. S. (1932). "The phonetics of Albanian". Language. 8 (4): 271–293. doi:10.2307/408833. JSTOR 408833.
- Mott, Brian Leonard (2011). English Phonetics and Phonology for Spanish Speakers. Universitat. Vol. 49 (2a ed.). Publicacions i Edicions, Universitat de Barcelona. p. 56. ISBN 9788447535040.
- Nolan, Francis (1988). "2.2 Vowels". Journal of the International Phonetic Association. 18 (2): 69–74. doi:10.1017/S0025100300003650. JSTOR 44526002.
- Pandeli, Helen; Eska, Joseph F. Eska; Ball, Martin J.; Rahilly, Joan (1997). "Problems of Phonetic Transcription: The Case of the Hiberno-English Slit-t". Journal of the International Phonetic Association. 27 (1/2): 65–75. doi:10.1017/S0025100300005430. JSTOR 44516140.
- Skarnitzl, Radek; Rálišová, Diana (2023). "Phonetic variation of Irish English /t/ in the syllabic coda". Journal of the International Phonetic Association. 53 (3): 728–747. doi:10.1017/S0025100321000347.
- Roach, Peter J. (1989). "Report on the 1989 Kiel Convention: INTERNATIONAL PHONETIC ASSOCIATION". Journal of the International Phonetic Association. 19 (2): 67–80. JSTOR 44526032.
- Stone, Maureen; Lundberg, Andrew (1996). "Three-dimensional tongue surface shapes of English consonants and vowels" (PDF). Journal of the Acoustical Society of America. 99 (6): 3728–3737. Bibcode:1996ASAJ...99.3728S. doi:10.1121/1.414969. PMID 8655804. Archived from the original (PDF) on 2023-03-24.
