= Sibilant =

Type of consonant sound

Sibilants (from Latin: sibilans 'hissing') are fricative and affricate consonants of higher amplitude and pitch, produced with a high velocity jet of air going on to strike the edge of some obstruction, such as the teeth and sometimes the lips. Examples of sibilants in English are the consonants at the beginning of words sip, zip, ship, and genre. The symbols in the International Phonetic Alphabet used to denote the sibilant sounds in these words are, respectively, [s, z, ʃ, ʒ]. Sibilants have a characteristically intense sound, which accounts for their paralinguistic use in getting one's attention (e.g. calling someone using "psst!" or quieting someone using "shhhh!").

== Overview ==
In the alveolar hissing sibilants, such as [s, z], the tongue forms a narrow channel (groove) to focus the stream of air towards the teeth, resulting in a higher pitched and more intense sound. With the postalveolar hushing sibilants (occasionally called shibilants, suggestive of their quality), such as [ʃ, ʒ], the tongue is flatter, and the resulting pitch lower.

A broader category is stridents, which also includes labiodental and uvular fricatives. Sibilants are a higher pitched subset of the stridents. The English sibilants are:

- Fricatives /s, z, ʃ, ʒ/
- Affricates /tʃ, dʒ/

while the English stridents are:

- /s, z, ʃ, ʒ, tʃ, dʒ, f, v/

as /f/ and /v/ are stridents but not sibilants because they are lower in pitch.

Some linguistics use the terms "stridents" and "sibilants" interchangeably to refer to the greater amplitude and pitch compared to other fricatives.

"Stridency" refers to the perceptual intensity of the sound of a sibilant consonant, or obstacle fricatives or affricates, which refers to the critical role of the teeth in producing the sound as an obstacle to the airstream. Non-sibilant fricatives and affricates produce their characteristic sound directly with the tongue or lips etc. and the place of contact in the mouth, without secondary involvement of the teeth.

The characteristic intensity of sibilants means that small variations in tongue shape and position are perceivable, with the result that there are many sibilant types that contrast in various languages.

== Acoustics ==
Sibilants are louder than their non-sibilant counterparts, and most of their acoustic energy occurs at higher frequencies than non-sibilant fricatives – usually around 8,000 Hz.

== Sibilant types ==
All sibilants are coronal consonants (made with the tip or front part of the tongue). However, there is a great deal of variety among sibilants as to tongue shape, point of contact on the tongue, and point of contact on the upper side of the mouth.

The following variables affect sibilant sound quality, and, along with their possible values, are ordered from sharpest (highest-pitched) to dullest (lowest-pitched):

- Tongue shape: grooved, alveolo-palatal, palato-alveolar, retroflex
- Place of articulation (point of contact on the upper side of the mouth): dental or denti-alveolar, alveolar, postalveolar, palatal
- Point of contact on the tongue: laminal "closed" (see below), laminal non-"closed", apical, subapical

Generally, the values of the different variables co-occur so as to produce an overall sharper or duller sound. For example, a laminal denti-alveolar grooved sibilant occurs in Polish, and a subapical palatal retroflex sibilant occurs in Toda.

=== Tongue shape ===
The primary distinction among sibilants is the shape of the tongue. Because sibilants have such a high perceptual prominence, tongue shape is particularly important; small changes in tongue shape are easily audible and can be used to produce different speech sounds, even within a given language.

The following varieties of tongue shapes are defined, from sharpest and highest-pitched to dullest and lowest-pitched (see also § Possible combinations). Palatalization is an inherent part of the definitions of the varieties.

| Place of articulation | Tongue shape | Degree of palatalization | Example in IPA | Description |
|---|---|---|---|---|
| Alveolar | left–right concave (grooved) | none | [s z] | With a groove running down the centerline of the tongue. The groove channels a high-velocity jet of air into the teeth, which results in a high-pitched, piercing "hissing" sound. Because of the prominence of the sounds, they are the most common and most stable of sibilants cross-linguistically. They occur in English and are denoted with ⟨s⟩ (as in soon) and z (as in zone). |
| Alveolar | left–right concave (grooved) | secondary (variable) | [sʲ zʲ] | Combination of grooved shape with palatalization (raising or bowing of the middle of the tongue). Palatalized alveolars often occur in the Slavic languages with a hard–soft contrast (such as Russian); they sound similar to the cluster [sj] occurring in the middle of the English phrase miss you. |
| Denti-alveolar | left–right concave (grooved) | none | [s̪ z̪] | Combination of grooved shape with dentalization (often referred to as "lisping" (Note: Not to be confused with the lateral lisps [ʪ] and [ʫ] described in extIPA.)). Sibilants made with the tip (apical) or both the tip and blade (apicolaminal) of the tongue near the back of the upper teeth have a softer sound reminiscent of the English ⟨th⟩ sounds [θ] (as in think) and [ð] (as in this), though still with a distinct sibilant sharpness. Apicolaminals are typically denti-alveolar, while apicals approach true dental placement. These sounds are relatively uncommon, but occur for example in some dialects of Andalusian Spanish (where [s] and [θ] lack a distinction and both merge to [s̟], a feature called ceceo), some of the indigenous languages of California, Acehnese, and Saanich. |
| Alveolo-palatal | narrow convex (peaked) | strong | [ɕ ʑ] | With a convex, Ʌ-shaped (turned V) tongue, and highly palatalized. Such sounds are very rare in English (occurring only as occasional allophones in a few dialects), but characteristically occur for example in many varieties of Chinese, Russian, and Polish. |
| Palato-alveolar | broad convex (domed) | moderate | [ʃ ʒ] | With a convex, "domed" tongue and moderately palatalized. Such sounds occur in English and are denoted with a variety of possible letters, including ⟨sh, ch, s, si⟩ as in shin, machine, measure, vision, respectively. Sometimes referred to as "lamino-postalveolar" or "lamino-prepalatal". |
| Retroflex | flat (neutral) | none | [ʂ̻ ʐ̻] | With a mildly retracted tongue, neither curled nor palatalized, showing minimal concavity or convexity. Laminal retroflex sibilants do not retract as much as their apical and subapical counterparts (below), and are typically the most flat of all of the sibilants, though they may still approach a slight degree of doming. As such they are also sometimes referred to as "lamino-postalveolar" or "lamino-prepalatal", or if distinguished, "flat postalveolar". |
| Retroflex | front–back concave (curled) | none | [ʂ̺ ʐ̺] | With a moderately concave, retracted tongue and no palatalization. Apical retroflex sibilants have less curling than their subapical counterparts (below), though still typically form a concavity. They tend to show some degree of velarization, and may approach a rhotic-like quality. Sometimes referred to as "apico-postalveolar" or "apico-prepalatal". |
| Retroflex | front–back concave (curled) | none | [ʂ ʐ] | With a strongly concave, curled back tongue and no palatalization. The subapical palatal (or "true retroflex") sibilants are the very dullest and lowest-pitched of all of the sibilants. Like their apical counterparts (above), they tend to show some degree of velarization, and may exhibit a near rhotic-like quality. Sometimes referred to as "subapical-postalveolar" or "subapical-prepalatal". |

The alveolar sibilants are often labelled as hissing sounds, while the other types are often labelled as hushing sounds (sometimes referred to as shibilants because of their quality). Speaking non-technically, the retroflex consonant [ʂ] sounds somewhat like a mixture between the regular English [ʃ] of "ship" and a strong American "r"; while the alveolo-palatal consonant [ɕ] sounds somewhat like a mixture of English [ʃ] of "ship" and the [sj] in the middle of "miss you".

=== Place of articulation ===
Sibilants can be made at any coronal articulation, i.e. the tongue can contact the upper side of the mouth anywhere from the upper teeth (dental) to the hard palate (palatal), with the in-between articulations being denti-alveolar, alveolar and postalveolar.

=== Point of contact on the tongue ===
The tongue can contact the upper side of the mouth with the very tip of the tongue (an apical articulation, e.g. [ʃ̺]); with the surface just behind the tip, called the blade of the tongue (a laminal articulation, e.g. [ʃ̻]); or with the underside of the tip (a subapical articulation). Apical and subapical articulations are always tongue-up, with the tip of the tongue above the teeth, while laminal articulations can be either tongue-up or tongue-down, with the tip of the tongue behind the lower teeth. This distinction is particularly important for retroflex sibilants, because all three varieties can occur, with noticeably different sound qualities.

For tongue-down laminal articulations, an additional distinction can be made depending on where exactly behind the lower teeth the tongue tip is placed. A little ways back from the lower teeth is a hollow area (or pit) in the lower surface of the mouth. When the tongue tip rests in this hollow area, there is an empty space below the tongue (a sublingual cavity), which results in a relatively duller sound. When the tip of the tongue rests against the lower teeth, there is no sublingual cavity, resulting in a sharper sound. Usually, the position of the tip of the tongue correlates with the grooved vs. hushing tongue shape so as to maximize the differences. However, the palato-alveolar sibilants in the Northwest Caucasian languages such as Ubykh are an exception. These sounds have the tongue tip resting directly against the lower teeth, which gives the sounds a quality that Catford describes as "hissing-hushing". Ladefoged and Maddieson term this a "closed laminal postalveolar" articulation, and transcribe them (following Catford) as [ŝ, ẑ], although this is not an IPA notation.

== Symbols in the IPA ==
The following table shows the types of sibilant fricatives defined in the International Phonetic Alphabet:

IPA letters for sibilants

Voiceless
| IPA | Description | Example | | | |
| IPA | Description | Language | Orthography | IPA | Meaning |
|---|---|---|---|---|---|
| s | voiceless alveolar sibilant | English | sip | [sɪp] | "sip" |
| ɕ | voiceless alveolo-palatal sibilant | Mandarin | 小 (xiǎo) | [ɕjɑ̀ʊ̯] | "small" |
| ʃ | voiceless palato-alveolar sibilant | English | shin | [ʃɪn] | "shin" |
| ʂ | voiceless retroflex sibilant | Mandarin | 上海 (Shànghǎi) | [ʂɑ̂ŋ.xàɪ̯] | "Shanghai" |

Voiced
| IPA | Description | Example | | | |
| IPA | Description | Language | Orthography | IPA | Meaning |
|---|---|---|---|---|---|
| z | voiced alveolar sibilant | English | zip | [zɪp] | "zip" |
| ʑ | voiced alveolo-palatal sibilant | Polish | zioło | [ˈʑɔwɔ] | "herb" |
| ʒ | voiced palato-alveolar sibilant | English | vision | [ˈvɪʒən] | "vision" |
| ʐ | voiced retroflex sibilant | Russian; Polish | жаба żaba | [ˈʐabə] [ˈʐaba] | "toad" "frog" |

Diacritics can be used for finer detail. For example, apical and laminal alveolars can be specified as [s̺] vs [s̻]; a dental (or more likely denti-alveolar) sibilant as [s̪]; a palatalized alveolar as [sʲ]; and a generic "retracted sibilant" as [s̠], a transcription frequently used for the sharper-quality types of retroflex consonants (e.g. the laminal "flat" type and the "apico-alveolar" type). There is no diacritic to denote the laminal "closed" articulation of palato-alveolars in the Northwest Caucasian languages, but they are sometimes provisionally transcribed as [ŝ ẑ].

== Possible combinations ==
The attested possibilities, with exemplar languages, are as follows. Note that the IPA diacritics are simplified; some articulations would require two diacritics to be fully specified, but only one is used in order to keep the results legible without the need for OpenType IPA fonts. Also, Ladefoged has resurrected an obsolete IPA symbol, the under dot, to indicate apical postalveolar (normally included in the category of retroflex consonants), and that notation is used here. (Note that the notations for ⟨ṣ, s̠⟩ is sometimes reversed; either may also be called 'retroflex' and written as simply ⟨ʂ⟩.)

| IPA | Tongue shape | Place of articulation | | Exemplifying languages |
| IPA | Tongue shape | Passive articulator (mouth) | Active articulator (tongue) | Exemplifying languages |
|---|---|---|---|---|
| [s̺̪ z̺̪] | grooved | dental | apical | southeast European Spanish s/z, Kumeyaay |
| [s̪ z̪] | grooved | denti-alveolar | apicolaminal | Polish s, z; Basque z, tz |
| [s̺ z̺] | grooved | alveolar | apical | northern peninsular Spanish s; Basque s, ts; Mandarin s, z, c (apical, dental or alveolar) |
| [s z] | grooved | alveolar | apical or laminal | English s, z (alveolar, laminal or apical); American or southwest European Spanish s/z |
| [s̻ z̻] | grooved | alveolar | laminal | Toda, Ubykh, Abkhaz |
| [ʃ ʒ] | domed | postalveolar | apical or laminal | English sh, ch, j, zh and French ch, j ([ʃʷ ʒʷ]) |
| [ʃ̻ ʒ̻] | domed | postalveolar | laminal | Toda; Basque x, tx |
| [ɕ ʑ] | palatalized | postalveolar | laminal | Mandarin x, j, q; Polish ś, ć, ź, dź; Ubykh; Abkhaz |
| [ŝ ẑ]^{1} | closed (no cavity) | postalveolar | laminal | Ubykh; Abkhaz |
| [ʂ̻ ʐ̻], [ṣ ẓ] | flat (cavity under tongue) | postalveolar | laminal | Polish sz, cz, ż, dż ([ʂ̻ʷ, tʂ̻ʷ, ʐ̻ʷ, dʐ̻ʷ]); Mandarin sh, zh, ch |
| [ʂ̺ ʐ̺], [s̠ z̠], etc.^{2} | hollow | postalveolar | apical | Ubykh; Abkhaz; Kumeyaay; Toda; Russian |
| [ʂ ʐ] | curled | postalveolar or palatal | subapical | Toda |

^1 ⟨ŝ ẑ⟩ is an ad-hoc transcription. The old IPA letters ⟨ʆ ʓ⟩ are also available.

^2 These sounds are usually just transcribed ⟨ʂ ʐ⟩. Apical postalveolar and subapical palatal sibilants do not contrast in any language, but if necessary, apical postalveolars can be transcribed with an apical diacritic, as ⟨s̠̺ z̠̺⟩ or ⟨ʂ̺ ʐ̺⟩. Ladefoged resurrects the old retroflex sub-dot for apical retroflexes, ⟨ṣ ẓ⟩ Also seen in the literature on e.g. Hindi and Norwegian is ⟨ᶘ ᶚ⟩ – the domed articulation of [ʃ ʒ] precludes a subapical realization.

=== Whistled sibilants ===
Whistled

◌͎

Whistled sibilants occur phonemically in several southern Bantu languages, the best known being Shona. They also occur in speech pathology and may be caused by dental prostheses or orthodontics.

The whistled sibilants of Shona have been variously described—as labialized but not velarized, as retroflex, etc., but these features are not necessarily required to produce the sounds. Using diacritics provided in extIPA, Shona sv and zv may be transcribed ⟨s͎⟩ and ⟨z͎⟩. Other transcriptions seen include purely labialized ⟨s̫⟩ and ⟨z̫⟩ (Ladefoged and Maddieson 1996) and labially co-articulated ⟨sᶲ⟩ and ⟨zᵝ⟩ (or ⟨s͡ɸ⟩ and ⟨z͜β⟩). In the otherwise IPA transcription of Shona in Doke (1967), the whistled sibilants are transcribed with the non-IPA letters ⟨ȿ ɀ⟩ and ⟨tȿ dɀ⟩.

Besides Shona, whistled sibilants have been reported as phonemes in Kalanga, Tsonga, Changana, Tswa—all of which are Southern African languages—and Tabasaran. The articulation of whistled sibilants may differ between languages. In Shona, the lips are compressed throughout, and the sibilant may be followed by normal labialization upon release. (That is, there is a contrast among s, sw, ȿ, ȿw.) In Tsonga, the whistling effect is weak; the lips are narrowed but also the tongue is retroflex. Tswa may be similar. In Changana, the lips are rounded (protruded), but so is /s/ in the sequence /usu/, so there is evidently some distinct phonetic phenomenon occurring here that has yet to be formally identified and described.

== Linguistic contrasts among sibilants ==
Not including differences in manner of articulation or secondary articulation, some languages have as many as four different types of sibilants. For example, Southern Qiang have a four-way distinction among sibilant affricates /ts tʃ tɕ tʂ/, with one for each of the four tongue shapes. Toda has a four-way distinction among sibilant fricatives /s̪ s̠ ʃ ʂ/.

The now-extinct Ubykh language was particularly complex, with a total of 27 sibilant consonants. Not only all four tongue shapes were represented (with the palato-alveolar appearing in the laminal "closed" variation) but also both the palato-alveolars and alveolo-palatals could additionally appear labialized. Besides, there was a five-way manner distinction among voiceless and voiced fricatives, voiceless and voiced affricates, and ejective affricates. (The three labialized palato-alveolar affricates were missing, which is why the total was 27, not 30.) The Bzyp dialect of the related Abkhaz language also has a similar inventory.

Some languages have four types when palatalization is considered. Polish is one example, with both palatalized and non-palatalized laminal denti-alveolars, laminal postalveolar (or "flat retroflex"), and alveolo-palatal ([s̪ z̪] [s̪ʲ z̪ʲ] [s̠ z̠] [ɕ ʑ]).

Somewhat more common are languages with three sibilant types, including one hissing and two hushing. As with Polish and Russian, the two hushing types are usually postalveolar and alveolo-palatal since these are the two most distinct from each other. Mandarin Chinese is an example of such a language. However, other possibilities exist. Serbo-Croatian has alveolar, flat postalveolar and alveolo-palatal affricates whereas Basque has palato-alveolar and laminal and apical alveolar (apico-alveolar) fricatives and affricates (late Medieval peninsular Spanish and Portuguese had the same distinctions among fricatives).

Many languages, such as English or Arabic, have two sibilant types, one hissing and one hushing. A wide variety of languages across the world have this pattern. Perhaps most common is the pattern, as in English and Arabic, with alveolar and palato-alveolar sibilants. Tajik, like English and Arabic, also contrasts (hissing) alveolar sibilants with (hushing) postalveolar sibilants, but the articulation of the latter varies significantly between regional dialects. Modern northern peninsular Spanish has a single apico-alveolar sibilant fricative [s̠], as well as a single palato-alveolar sibilant affricate [tʃ]. However, there are also languages with alveolar and apical retroflex sibilants (such as Standard Vietnamese) and with alveolar and alveolo-palatal postalveolars (e.g. alveolar and laminal palatalized [ʃ ʒ tʃ dʒ] i.e. [ʃʲ ʒʲ tʃʲ dʒʲ] in Catalan and Brazilian Portuguese, the latter probably through Amerindian influence, and alveolar and dorsal i.e. [ɕ ʑ tɕ dʑ] proper in Japanese).

Only a few languages with sibilants lack the hissing type. Middle Vietnamese is normally reconstructed with two sibilant fricatives, both hushing (one retroflex, one alveolo-palatal). Some languages have only a single hushing sibilant and no hissing sibilant. That occurs in southern Peninsular Spanish dialects of the "ceceo" type, which have replaced the former hissing fricative with [θ], leaving only [tʃ].

Languages with no sibilants are fairly rare. Most have no fricatives at all or only the fricative /h/. Examples include most Australian languages, and Rotokas, and what is generally reconstructed for Proto-Bantu. Languages with fricatives but no sibilants, however, do occur, such as Ukue in Nigeria, which has only the fricatives /f, v, h/. Also, almost all Eastern Polynesian languages have no sibilants but do have the fricatives /v/ and/or /f/: Māori, Hawaiian, Tahitian, Rapa Nui, most Cook Islands Māori dialects, Marquesan, and Tuamotuan.

Tamil only has the sibilant /ʂ/ and fricative /f/ in loanwords, and they are frequently replaced by native sounds. The sibilants [s, ɕ] exist as allophones of /t͡ɕ/ and the fricative [h] as an allophone of /k/.

== Contested definitions ==
Authors including Chomsky and Halle group [f, v] as sibilants. However, they do not have the high frequencies of other sibilants, nor do they involve any constriction of the tongue, and most phoneticians continue to group them together with bilabial [ɸ, β] and (inter)dental [θ, ð] as non-sibilant anterior fricatives. For a grouping of sibilants and [f, v], the term strident is more common. Some researchers judge [f] to be non-strident in English, based on measurements of its comparative amplitude, but to be strident in other languages (for example, in the African language Ewe, where it contrasts with non-strident [ɸ]).

The palatal fricatives [ç, ʝ] share the characteristic high frequency sound with sibilants, but they are not 'obstacle fricatives', and therefore not typically classified as sibilants. The nature of sibilants as so-called 'obstacle fricatives' is complicated – there is a continuum of possibilities relating to the angle at which the jet of air may strike an obstacle. The grooving often considered necessary for classification as a sibilant for anterior fricatives has been observed in ultrasound studies of the tongue for the supposedly non-sibilant voiceless dental fricative [θ] of English.

== See also ==
- De-essing
- Assibilation
- Grooved fricative

== Bibliography ==
- Bright, William (1978), "Sibilants and naturalness in aboriginal California", Journal of California Anthropology, Papers in Linguistics, 1: 39–63
- Catford, J. C. (1982) [1977]. Fundamental Problems in Phonetics. Indiana University Press. ISBN 0-253-32520-X.
- Dalbor, John B. (1980), "Observations on Present-Day Seseo and Ceceo in Southern Spain", Hispania, 63 (1), American Association of Teachers of Spanish and Portuguese: 5–19, doi:10.2307/340806, JSTOR 340806
- Hualde, José Ignacio (1991), Basque phonology, London: Routledge, JSTOR 340806
- Ladefoged, Peter; Maddieson, Ian (1996). The Sounds of the World's Languages. Oxford: Blackwell. ISBN 0-631-19815-6.
- Obaid, Antonio H. (1973), "The Vagaries of the Spanish 'S'", Hispania, 56 (1), American Association of Teachers of Spanish and Portuguese: 60–67, doi:10.2307/339038, JSTOR 339038
- Shosted, Ryan K. (2006), Just put your lips together and blow? The whistled fricatives of Southern Bantu (PDF)
- Ido, Shinji (2026). "A Spectral Analysis of the Voiceless Postalveolar Fricative in Two Varieties of Tajik". In Falahati, R.; Ghane, Z. (eds.). Handbook of Phonetics and Phonology of Modern Iranian Languages. Springer Handbooks in Languages and Linguistics. Singapore: Springer. pp. 139–153. doi:10.1007/978-981-95-0383-4_6. Accepted manuscript via hdl:2237/0002015475.
