= Anterior consonant =

Consonants articulated at or in front of the alveolar ridge

In featural phonology, anterior consonants [+ant] refer to consonants with their place of articulation at or in front of the alveolar ridge.

Historically, linguists had considered the class to include labial, dental, and alveolar consonants, but modern terminology excludes labials, making [± ant] a distinctive feature solely within coronal consonants. By contrast, the remaining coronals, those being postalveolar and retroflex, are nonanterior consonants [−ant] (as well as palatals, if considered to be coronal).

Nonanteriors may also be called posterior consonants, though the latter term is also used more specifically to refer to consonants produced at or behind the hard palate (therefore [+post]), thus including dorsal and laryngeal consonants. Occasionally, retroflex consonants may be excluded from both the anterior and posterior classes ([−ant, −post]).

== Bibliography ==
- Anderson, Victoria Balboa; Maddieson, Ian (1994). Acoustic Characteristics of Tiwi Coronal Stops (PDF). UCLA Working Papers in Phonetics. Vol. 87.
- Chomsky, Noam; Halle, Morris (1968). The Sound Pattern of English (PDF). Studies in Language. New York, NY, Evanston, IL, & London, England: Harper & Row. ISBN 978-0060412760.
- Gayraud, Frédérique; Barkat-Defradas, Melissa; Lahrouchi, Mohamed; Ben Hamed, Mahé (2018). "Development of phonetic complexity in Arabic, Berber, English and French". Canadian Journal of Linguistics/Revue canadienne de linguistique. 63 (4). doi:10.1017/cnj.2018.9.
- Gouskova, Maria (2016). Features in Phonology (PDF).
- Halle, Morris; Clements, G. N. (1983). Problem Book in Phonology: A Workbook for Introductory Courses in Linguistics and in Modern Phonology. Cambridge, MA & London, England: The MIT Press. ISBN 978-0262580595.
- Keating, Patricia A. (1988). A Survey of Phonological Features (PDF). Indiana University Linguistics Club.
- Keating, Patricia A. (1991). "Coronal Places of Articulation" (PDF). In Paradis, Carole; Prunet, Jean-François (eds.). The Special Status of Coronals: Internal and External Evidence. Phonetics and Phonology. Vol. 2. Academic Press. doi:10.1016/B978-0-12-544966-3.50008-7. ISBN 9780125449663.
- Kochetov, Alexei; Colantoni, Laura (2011). "Coronal Place Contrasts in Argentine and Cuban Spanish: An Electropalatographic Study". Journal of the International Phonetic Association. 41 (3). doi:10.1017/S0025100311000338. JSTOR 44526619.
- Mena, Daniela; Figueroa, Mauricio; Rogers, Brandon; Salamanca, Gastón (2019). "Losing one allophone at a time: an acoustic and statistical study on Mapdungun's sixth vowel" (PDF). In Calhoun, Sasha; Escudero, Paola; Tabain, Marija; Warren, Paul (eds.). Proceedings of the 19th International Congress of Phonetic Sciences. Australasian Speech Science and Technology Association Inc. & International Phonetic Association. ISBN 978-0-646-80069-1. ISSN 2412-0669.
