= Voiced alveolar fricative =

Consonantal sound often represented by ⟨z⟩ in IPA

Voiced alveolar sibilant

z
- IPA number: 133

Audio sample
- source · help

Encoding
- Entity (decimal): &#122;
- Unicode (hex): U+007A
- X-SAMPA: z
- Braille: ⠵ (braille pattern dots-1356)
Image

Voiced alveolar fricatives are consonantal sounds. The symbol in the International Phonetic Alphabet that represents these sounds depends on whether a sibilant or non-sibilant fricative is being described.

- The symbol for an alveolar sibilant is ⟨z⟩. The IPA letter ⟨z⟩ is not normally used for dental or postalveolar sibilants in narrow transcription unless modified by a diacritic (⟨z̪⟩ and ⟨z̠⟩ respectively).
- The IPA symbol for an alveolar non-sibilant fricative is derived by means of diacritics; it can be ⟨ð̠⟩ or ⟨ɹ̝⟩.

Voiced coronal fricatives
| | Inter- dental | Dental | Denti- alveolar | Alveolar | Post-alveolar | | | |
| | Inter- dental | Dental | Denti- alveolar | Alveolar | Retracted | Retroflex | Palato- alveolar | Alveolo- palatal |
|---|---|---|---|---|---|---|---|---|
| Sibilant | z̪̟ | z̪ | z̟ | z͇ | z̠ | ʐ | ʒ | ʑ |
| Non-sibilant | ð̟ | ð | ð̠ | ð͇ | | ɻ̝ | ɹ̠˔ | |

== Voiced alveolar sibilant ==
A voiced alveolar sibilant is common across European languages, but is relatively uncommon cross-linguistically compared to its voiceless variant. Only about 28% of the world's languages contain a voiced dental or alveolar sibilant. Moreover, 85% of the languages with some form of [z] are languages of Europe, Africa, or Western Asia.

=== Features ===
- Its manner of articulation is sibilant (a subclass of fricatives and affricates), which means it is generally produced with a higher-frequency turbulence. Sibilants may be articulated with various tongue shapes and degrees of palatalization, depending on their place of articulation.
- There are at least three specific variants of [z]:
  - Dentalized laminal alveolar (commonly called "dental"), which means it is articulated with the tongue blade very close to the upper front teeth, with the tongue tip resting behind lower front teeth. The hissing effect in this variety of [z] is very strong.
  - Non-retracted alveolar, which means it is articulated with either the tip or the blade of the tongue at the alveolar ridge, termed respectively apical and laminal. According to Ladefoged & Maddieson (1996) about half of English speakers use a non-retracted apical articulation.
  - Retracted alveolar, which means it is articulated with either the tip or the blade of the tongue slightly behind the alveolar ridge, termed respectively apical and laminal. Acoustically, it is close to [ʒ] or laminal [ʐ].
- Its phonation is voiced, which means the vocal cords vibrate during the articulation.
- It is an oral consonant, which means that air is not allowed to escape through the nose.
- It is a median consonant, which means it is produced by directing the airstream down the midline of the tongue, rather than to the sides.
- Its airstream mechanism is pulmonic, which means it is articulated by pushing air only with the intercostal muscles and abdominal muscles, as in most speech sounds.

=== Occurrence ===
==== Dentalized laminal alveolar ====
Voiced dental sibilant

z̪

| Language | | Word | IPA | Meaning | Notes |
|---|---|---|---|---|---|
| Armenian | Eastern | զարդ / zart | [z̪ɑɾt̪ʰ] | 'decoration' | |
| Azerbaijani | | zoğ | [z̪ɔʁ] | 'sprout' | |
| Belarusian | | база / baza | [ˈbäz̪ä] | 'base' | Contrasts with palatalized form. See Belarusian phonology |
| Bulgarian | | езеро / ezero | [ˈɛz̪ɛro] | 'lake' | Contrasts with palatalized form. |
| English | Multicultural London | zoo | [z̪ʏˑy̯] | 'zoo' | See English phonology |
| French | | zèbre | [z̪ɛbʁ] | 'zebra' | See French phonology |
| Hungarian | | zálog | [ˈz̪äːl̪oɡ] | 'pledge' | See Hungarian phonology |
| Kashubian | | zajc | [ˈzajt͡s] | 'hare' | |
| Kazakh | | заң / zań | [z̪ɑŋ] | 'law' | |
| Kyrgyz | | заң / zań | [z̪ɑŋ] | 'law' | |
| Latvian | | zars | [z̪ärs̪] | 'branch' | See Latvian phonology |
| Macedonian | | зошто / zošto | [ˈz̪ɔʃt̪ɔ] | 'why' | See Macedonian phonology |
| Mirandese | | daprendizaige | [d̪əpɾẽd̪iˈz̪ajʒ(ɯ̽)] | 'learning' | Contrasts seven sibilants altogether, preserving medieval Ibero-Romance contrasts. |
| Polish | | zero | [ˈz̪ɛrɔ] | 'zero' | See Polish phonology |
| Portuguese | Most speakers | Estados Unidos | [isˈt̪ad̪uz̪‿ʉˈnid͡zᶶ(ˢ)] | 'United States' | See Portuguese phonology |
| Romanian | | zar | [z̪är] | 'dice' | See Romanian phonology |
| Russian | | заезжать / zaězžať | [z̪əɪˈʑætʲ] | 'to pick up' | Contrasts with palatalized form. See Russian phonology |
| Serbo-Croatian | | зајам / zajam | [z̪ǎːjäm] | 'loan' | See Serbo-Croatian phonology |
| Slovak | | zima | [ˈz̪imä] | 'winter' | |
| Slovene | | zima | [ˈz̪ìːmá] | 'winter' | |
| Turkish | | göz | [ɟø̞̈z̪] | 'eye' | See Turkish phonology |
| Ukrainian | | зуб / zub | [z̪ub] | 'tooth' | Contrasts with palatalized form. See Ukrainian phonology |
| Upper Sorbian | | koza | [ˈkɔz̪ä] | 'goat' | |
| Uzbek | | zafar | [z̪äˈfäɾ] | 'victory' | |
| Vietnamese | Hanoi | da | [z̪äː] | 'skin' | See Vietnamese phonology |

==== Alveolar ====
| Language | | Word | IPA | Meaning | Notes |
|---|---|---|---|---|---|
| Adyghe | | зы / zy | [ˈzə] | 'one' | |
| Albanian | | zjarr | [zjar] | 'fire' | |
| Arabic | Standard | زائِر / zāʾir | [ˈzaːʔir] | 'visitor' | See Arabic phonology |
| Assamese | | জলকীয়া / jolokīẏā | [zɔlɔkija] | 'chili' | |
| Assyrian | | ܙܢ̱ܓܐ / zìga | [ziɡa] | 'bell' | |
| Bengali | | জ়োর / zōɹ | [zoɹ] | 'obligatory' | Only occurs in loanwords. See Bengali phonology |
| Breton | | iliz | [iliz] | 'church' | |
| Chechen | | зурма / zurma | [zuɾma] | 'music' | |
| Czech | | zima | [ˈzɪma] | 'winter' | See Czech phonology |
| Emilian | Bolognese | raṡån | [raːz̺ʌŋ] | 'reason' | Palatalized apical; may be [ʐ] or [ʒ] instead. |
| English | | zoo | [zuː] | 'zoo' | Absent from some Scottish and Asian dialects. See English phonology |
| Esperanto | | kuzo | [ˈkuzo] | 'cousin' | See Esperanto phonology |
| Georgian | | ზარი / zari | [ˈzɑɾi] | 'bell' | |
| Greek | Athens dialect | ζάλη / záli | [ˈz̻ali] | 'dizziness' | See Modern Greek phonology |
| Hebrew | | זאב / ze'eb | [zeˈʔev] | 'wolf' | See Modern Hebrew phonology |
| Hindustani | Hindi | ज़मीन / zamīn | [zəmiːn] | 'land' | May be replaced in Hindi by [dʒ]. See Hindustani phonology |
| Hindustani | Urdu | زمین / zamīn | [zəmiːn] | 'land' | May be replaced in Hindi by [dʒ]. See Hindustani phonology |
| Irish | | zú | [zˠuː] | 'zoo' | Only used in loanwords. (loan consonant) See Irish phonology |
| Japanese | | 全部 / zenbu | [zembɯ] | 'everything' | Might be replaced with [dz]. See Japanese phonology |
| Kabardian | | зы zə | [ˈzə] | 'one' | |
| Kalaw Lagaw Ya | | zilamiz | [zilʌmiz] | 'go' | |
| Kashmiri | | ज़ानुन / زانُن / zānun | [zaːnun] | 'to know' | |
| Khmer | | បែលហ្ស៊ិក / bêlhsĭk | [ɓaelzɨk] | noun: 'Belgium', 'Belgian(s)' adjective: 'Belgian' | See Khmer phonology |
| Konda | | sunz | [sunz] | 'to sleep' | |
| Malay | | beza | [bezə] | 'difference' | |
| Maltese | | żelu | [zelu] | 'zeal' | |
| Marathi | | जर / jar | [zər] | 'if' | See Marathi phonology. |
| Nepali | | हजार / hajār | [ɦʌzäɾ] | 'thousand' | Coda and intervocalic allophone of /d͡z/ and /d͡zʱ/. |
| Nepali | | कागज / kāgaj | [käɣʌz] | 'paper' | Coda and intervocalic allophone of /d͡z/ and /d͡zʱ/. |
| Nepali | | बुझाउनु / bujhāunu | [buzäu̯nu] | 'to explain' | Coda and intervocalic allophone of /d͡z/ and /d͡zʱ/. |
| Nepali | | माझ / mājh | [mäz] | 'middle' | Coda and intervocalic allophone of /d͡z/ and /d͡zʱ/. |
| Occitan | Limousin | jòune | [ˈzɒwne] | 'young' | See Occitan phonology |
| Persian | | روز | [ɾuːz] | 'day' | |
| Portuguese | | casa | [ˈkazɐ] | 'house' | See Portuguese phonology |
| Punjabi | Gurmukhi | ਹਜ਼ਾਰ / hazār | [həˈzaːr] | 'thousand' | May be replaced by [dʒ] in Gurmukhi (Indian) varieties. |
| Punjabi | Shahmukhi | ہزار / hazār | [həˈzaːr] | 'thousand' | May be replaced by [dʒ] in Gurmukhi (Indian) varieties. |
| Spanish | Andalusian | comunismo | [ko̞muˈnizmo̞] | 'communism' | Allophone of /s/ before voiced consonants, when it is not debuccalized to [h ~ ɦ]. Present in dialects which realize /s/ as a non-retracted alveolar fricative. Before /d/ it is dental [z̪]. |
| Spanish | Latin American | comunismo | [ko̞muˈnizmo̞] | 'communism' | Allophone of /s/ before voiced consonants, when it is not debuccalized to [h ~ ɦ]. Present in dialects which realize /s/ as a non-retracted alveolar fricative. Before /d/ it is dental [z̪]. |
| Spanish | Filipino | comunismo | [ko̞muˈnizmo̞] | 'communism' | Allophone of /s/ before voiced consonants, when it is not debuccalized to [h ~ ɦ]. Present in dialects which realize /s/ as a non-retracted alveolar fricative. Before /d/ it is dental [z̪]. |
| Swahili | | lazima | [lɑzimɑ] | 'must' | |
| Tamil | Jaffna Tamil | கடுதாசி | [kɐɖuðaːzi] | 'letter' | Was only reported for 1 speaker in the sample but he pronounced it regularly. |
| West Frisian | | sizze | [ˈsɪzə] | 'to say' | It never occurs in word-initial positions. See West Frisian phonology |
| Yi | | ꍂ / ssy | [zɹ̩˧] | 'generation' | |
| Yiddish | | זון / zien | [zin] | 'son' | |
| Zapotec | Tilquiapan | guanaz | [ɡʷanaz] | 'went to grab' | |

==== Retracted alveolar ====
Voiced retracted alveolar sibilant

z̠

z̺

| Language | | Word | IPA | Meaning | Notes |
|---|---|---|---|---|---|
| Catalan | Most dialects | zel | [ˈz̺ɛɫ] | 'zeal' | Apical. See Catalan phonology} |
| Catalan | Some dialects | utilitzar | [u̞t̪i̞ɫi̞ˈz̺ä(ɾ)] | 'to use' | Apical. Deaffrication found in some dialects (including Standard Valencian). See Catalan phonology |
| Galician | | mesmo | [ˈme̞z̺mo̞] | 'same' | Apical. Allophone of /s/ before voiced consonants. Before /d/ it is pronounced dentally [z̪]. |
| Greek | | μάζα / máza | [ˈmɐz̠ɐ] | 'mass' | See Modern Greek phonology |
| Italian | Central Italy | caso | [ˈkäːz̠o] | 'case' | Present in Lazio north of Cape Linaro, most of Umbria (save Perugia and the extreme south) and Marche south of the Potenza. |
| Italian | Northern Italy | caso | [ˈkäːz̠o] | 'case' | Apical. Present in many areas north of the La Spezia–Rimini Line. See Italian phonology |
| Italian | Sicily | caso | [ˈkäːz̠o] | 'case' | Present south and west of a line drawn from Syracuse to Cefalù. |
| Low German | | | | | |
| Maldivian | | zaraafaa | [z̺aˈraːfaː] | 'giraffe' | |
| Mirandese | | eisistir | [e̞jz̺is̺ˈtiɾ] | 'to exist' | Apical. Mirandese and neighboring Portuguese dialects were the only surviving oral tradition to preserve all seven mediaeval Ibero-Romance sibilants: ⟨ch⟩ /tʃ/, ⟨x⟩ /ʃ/, ⟨g⟩/⟨j⟩ /ʒ/, ⟨c⟩/⟨ç⟩ /s̪/, ⟨z⟩ /z̪/, ⟨s⟩/-⟨ss⟩- /s̺/, -⟨s⟩- /z̺/ |
| Occitan | Gascon | casèrna | [kaz̺ɛrno] | 'barracks' | See Occitan phonology |
| Occitan | Languedocien | véser | [bez̺e] | 'to see' | See Occitan phonology |
| Piedmontese | | amis | [aˈmiz̠] | 'friend' | Apical. See Piemontese phonology |
| Portuguese | Coastal Northern European | | | | Merges with non-retracted /z/. See Portuguese phonology |
| Portuguese | Inland Northern European | | | | Apical. Contrasts with non-retracted /z/. See Portuguese phonology |
| Spanish | Andean | mismo | [ˈmiz̺mo̞] | 'same' | Apical. Allophone of /s/ before voiced consonants. Before /d/ it is pronounced dentally [z̪]. See Spanish phonology |
| Spanish | Castilian | mismo | [ˈmiz̺mo̞] | 'same' | Apical. Allophone of /s/ before voiced consonants. Before /d/ it is pronounced dentally [z̪]. See Spanish phonology |
| Spanish | Paisa Region | mismo | [ˈmiz̺mo̞] | 'same' | Apical. Allophone of /s/ before voiced consonants. Before /d/ it is pronounced dentally [z̪]. See Spanish phonology |

==== Variable ====
| Language | | Word | IPA | Meaning | Notes |
|---|---|---|---|---|---|
| German | Standard | sauber | [ˈzäʊ̯bɐ] | 'clean' | Varies between dentalized laminal, non-retracted laminal and non-retracted apical. See Standard German phonology |
| Italian | Standard | caso | [ˈkäːzo] | 'case' | Varies between dentalized laminal and non-retracted apical. See Italian phonology |
| Italian | Ticino | caso | [ˈkäːzo] | 'case' | Varies between dentalized laminal and non-retracted apical. Both variants may be labiodentalized. See Italian phonology |
| Dutch | Belgian Standard | zeep | [zeːpʰ] | 'soap' | Laminal. See Dutch phonology |
| Dutch | Northern Standard | zeep | [zeɪ̯pʰ] | 'soap' | Laminal; may have only mid-to-low pitched friction. If not the main allophone, it is often retracted when preconsonantal, after rounded vowels and /r/. See Dutch phonology |
| Dutch | Northern Standard | zat | [ˈz̠ɑtʰ] | 'full', 'fed (up)' | Laminal; may have only mid-to-low pitched friction. If not the main allophone, it is often retracted when preconsonantal, after rounded vowels and /r/. See Dutch phonology |

== Voiced alveolar non-sibilant fricative ==
Voiced alveolar non-sibilant fricative

ð̠

ɹ̝

d̞

Audio sample
- source · help

A voiced alveolar non-sibilant fricative (also known as a slit fricative) is a consonantal sound in some spoken languages. As the International Phonetic Alphabet does not have separate symbols for non-sibilant alveolar fricatives, this sound can be transcribed by use of diacritics, such as ⟨ð̠⟩ (a retracted [ð]) or ⟨ɹ̝⟩ (a raised [ɹ], also often part of the affricate [dɹ̝]). Additional symbols include ⟨ð͇⟩ (with the alveolar diacritic, in extIPA) and ⟨d̞⟩ (a lowered [d]).

=== Features ===
- Its manner of articulation is fricative, which means it is produced by constricting air flow through a narrow channel at the place of articulation, causing turbulence. However, it does not have the grooved tongue and directed airflow, or the high frequencies, of a sibilant.
- Its place of articulation is alveolar, which means it is articulated with either the tip or the blade of the tongue at the alveolar ridge, termed respectively apical and laminal.
- Its phonation is voiced, which means the vocal cords vibrate during the articulation.
- It is an oral consonant, which means that air is not allowed to escape through the nose.
- It is a median consonant, which means it is produced by directing the airstream down the midline of the tongue, rather than to the sides.
- Its airstream mechanism is pulmonic, which means it is articulated by pushing air only with the intercostal muscles and abdominal muscles, as in most speech sounds.

=== Occurrence ===
| Language | | Word | IPA | Meaning | Notes |
|---|---|---|---|---|---|
| Czech | | čtyři | [ˈt͡ʃtɪɹ̝ɪ] | 'four' | May be a fricative trill or a tapped fricative (see below) instead. It contrasts with /r/ and /ʒ/. See Czech phonology |
| Dahalo | | [káð̠i] | | 'work' | Apical; only weakly fricated. It is a common intervocalic allophone of /d̠/, and may dental [ð] or a plosive [d] instead. |
| Dutch | | voor | [vöːɹ̝] | 'for' | One of many possible realizations of /r/; distribution unclear. See Dutch phonology |
| Emilian | Bolognese | chèṡ | [ˈkɛːð̠] | 'case' | Laminal |
| English | Scouse | maid | [meɪð̠] | 'maid' | Allophone of /d/. See English phonology |
| English | South African | round | [ɹ̝æʊ̯nd] | 'round' | Apical, present in some urban dialects. See South African English phonology |
| Extreme Southern Italian | Sicilian | raro | [ɹ̝aːɾo] | 'rare' | Corresponds to /rr/ in standard Italian, as well as word-initial /r/, and may be geminated. Described as a 'non-sulcalized sonorant', articulated without contact; may be closer to an approximant, depending on the speaker. |
| Extreme Southern Italian | Calabro | raro | [ɹ̝aːɾo] | 'rare' | Corresponds to /rr/ in standard Italian, as well as word-initial /r/, and may be geminated. Described as a 'non-sulcalized sonorant', articulated without contact; may be closer to an approximant, depending on the speaker. |
| Extreme Southern Italian | Salentino | raro | [ɹ̝aːɾo] | 'rare' | Corresponds to /rr/ in standard Italian, as well as word-initial /r/, and may be geminated. Described as a 'non-sulcalized sonorant', articulated without contact; may be closer to an approximant, depending on the speaker. |
| Icelandic | | góða | [ˈko̞ˑu̯ˑð̠ä] | 'good (inflexion)' | Usually apical, may be closer to an approximant; variably removed from the front teeth, up to (nearly) spot on [ð̞]. See Icelandic phonology |
| Manx | | mooar | [muːɹ̝] | 'big' | Pre-consonantal and word-final realization of /r/, in free variation with other allophones. |
| Scottish Gaelic | Southern Hebridean | èirigh | [ˈeːɹ̝ʲi] | 'to rise' | Apical and strongly palatalized. Corresponds to /ɾʲ/ in Skye and some mainland dialects, /ð/ in Lewis, [ʒ] in southern Barra and [j] in Tiree. |
| Scottish Gaelic | Wester Ross | coire | [ˈkʰɔɹ̝ʲə] | 'kettle' | Apical and strongly palatalized. Allophone of /ɾʲ/ after non-front vowels. |
| Swedish | Central Standard | vandra | [vän̪ːd̪ɹ̝ä] | 'wander' | Allophone of /r/ around the Stockholm area. See Swedish phonology |

=== Voiced alveolar tapped fricative ===
Voiced alveolar tapped fricative

ɾ̞

Audio sample
- source · help

A few languages also have a voiced alveolar tapped fricative, which is simply a very brief alveolar non-sibilant fricative, with the tongue making the gesture for a tapped stop but not making full contact. It can be indicated in the IPA with the lowering diacritic to show that full occlusion does not occur, such as ⟨ɾ̞⟩ (though this may also symbolize an "approximant tap"). Flapped fricatives are theoretically possible but are not attested.

| Language | | Word | IPA | Meaning | Notes |
|---|---|---|---|---|---|
| Aragonese | Chistabino | aire | [ˈäi̯ɾ̞e̞] | 'air' | Common realization of /ɾ/. |
| Tacana | | | | | |
| Turkish | | rüya | [ɾ̞yˈjɑː] | 'dream' | Word-initial allophone of /ɾ/. See Turkish phonology |

== See also ==
- Apical consonant
- Laminal consonant
- Index of phonetics articles

== Notes ==
| Place → | Labial | | | | | Coronal | | | | | | | | | | Dorsal | | | | | Laryngeal | | | |
| Manner ↓ | Bilabial | | Labiodental | | Linguolabial | | Dental | | Alveolar | | Postalveolar | | Retroflex | | (Alveolo-)palatal | | Velar | | Uvular | | Pharyngeal/epiglottal | | Glottal | |
|---|---|---|---|---|---|---|---|---|---|---|---|---|---|---|---|---|---|---|---|---|---|---|---|---|
| Nasal | m̥ | m | ɱ̊ | ɱ | | n̼ | n̪̊ | n̪ | n̥ | n | n̠̊ | n̠ | ɳ̊ | ɳ | ɲ̊ | ɲ | ŋ̊ | ŋ | ɴ̥ | ɴ | | | | |
| Plosive | p | b | p̪ | b̪ | t̼ | d̼ | t̪ | d̪ | t | d | | | ʈ | ɖ | c | ɟ | k | ɡ | q | ɢ | ʡ | | ʔ | |
| Sibilant affricate | | | | | | | t̪s̪ | d̪z̪ | ts | dz | t̠ʃ | d̠ʒ | tʂ | dʐ | tɕ | dʑ | | | | | | | | |
| Non-sibilant affricate | pɸ | bβ | p̪f | b̪v | | | t̪θ | d̪ð | tɹ̝̊ | dɹ̝ | t̠ɹ̠̊˔ | d̠ɹ̠˔ | | | cç | ɟʝ | kx | ɡɣ | qχ | ɢʁ | ʡʜ | ʡʢ | ʔh | |
| Sibilant fricative | | | | | | | s̪ | z̪ | s | z | ʃ | ʒ | ʂ | ʐ | ɕ | ʑ | | | | | | | | |
| Non-sibilant fricative | ɸ | β | f | v | θ̼ | ð̼ | θ | ð | θ̠ | ð̠ | ɹ̠̊˔ | ɹ̠˔ | ɻ̊˔ | ɻ˔ | ç | ʝ | x | ɣ | χ | ʁ | ħ | ʕ | h | ɦ |
| Approximant | | β̞ | | ʋ | | | | ð̞ | | ɹ | | ɹ̠ | | ɻ | | j | | ɰ | | | | | | ˷ |
| Tap/flap | | ⱱ̟ | | ⱱ | | | | | ɾ̥ | ɾ | | | ɽ̊ | ɽ | | | | | | ɢ̆ | | ʡ̆ | | |
| Trill | ʙ̥ | ʙ | | | | | | | r̥ | r | | r̠ | ɽ̊r̥ | ɽr | | | | | ʀ̥ | ʀ | ʜ | ʢ | | |
| Lateral affricate | | | | | | | | | tɬ | dɮ | | | tꞎ | d𝼅 | c𝼆 | ɟʎ̝ | k𝼄 | ɡʟ̝ | | | | | | |
| Lateral fricative | | | | | | | ɬ̪ | | ɬ | ɮ | | | ꞎ | 𝼅 | 𝼆 | ʎ̝ | 𝼄 | ʟ̝ | | | | | | |
| Lateral approximant | | | | | | | | l̪ | l̥ | l | | l̠ | ɭ̊ | ɭ | ʎ̥ | ʎ | ʟ̥ | ʟ | | ʟ̠ | | | | |
| Lateral tap/flap | | | | | | | | | ɺ̥ | ɺ | | | 𝼈̊ | 𝼈 | | ʎ̆ | | ʟ̆ | | | | | | |

| | | BL | LD | D | A | PA | RF | P | V | U |
|---|---|---|---|---|---|---|---|---|---|---|
| Implosive | Voiced | ɓ | | | ɗ | | ᶑ | ʄ | ɠ | ʛ |
| Implosive | Voiceless | ɓ̥ | | | ɗ̥ | | ᶑ̊ | ʄ̊ | ɠ̊ | ʛ̥ |
| Ejective | Stop | pʼ | | | tʼ | | ʈʼ | cʼ | kʼ | qʼ |
| Ejective | Affricate | | p̪fʼ | tθʼ | tsʼ | tʃʼ | tʂʼ | tɕʼ | kxʼ | qχʼ |
| Ejective | Fricative | ɸʼ | fʼ | θʼ | sʼ | ʃʼ | ʂʼ | ɕʼ | xʼ | χʼ |
| Ejective | Lateral affricate | | | | tɬʼ | | | c𝼆ʼ | k𝼄ʼ | q𝼄ʼ |
| Ejective | Lateral fricative | | | | ɬʼ | | | | | |
| Click (top: velar; bottom: uvular) | Tenuis | kʘ qʘ | | kǀ qǀ | kǃ qǃ | | k𝼊 q𝼊 | kǂ qǂ | | |
| Click (top: velar; bottom: uvular) | Voiced | ɡʘ ɢʘ | | ɡǀ ɢǀ | ɡǃ ɢǃ | | ɡ𝼊 ɢ𝼊 | ɡǂ ɢǂ | | |
| Click (top: velar; bottom: uvular) | Nasal | ŋʘ ɴʘ | | ŋǀ ɴǀ | ŋǃ ɴǃ | | ŋ𝼊 ɴ𝼊 | ŋǂ ɴǂ | ʞ | |
| Click (top: velar; bottom: uvular) | Tenuis lateral | | | | kǁ qǁ | | | | | |
| Click (top: velar; bottom: uvular) | Voiced lateral | | | | ɡǁ ɢǁ | | | | | |
| Click (top: velar; bottom: uvular) | Nasal lateral | | | | ŋǁ ɴǁ | | | | | |
