= Labioalveolar consonant =

Labioalveolar

◌͇

◌᫨

Labioalveolar consonants are articulated with the lower lip against the alveolar ridge. They are only found in disordered speech, typically occurring in speakers with excessive overbite when articulating labial consonants. In the extIPA, they are represented with the alveolar diacritic ⟨◌͇⟩ on the corresponding labial. To avoid descenders, it may be placed above instead: ⟨◌᫨⟩.

== List of consonants in the extIPA ==
extIPA symbol	Description
m͇̊	Voiceless labioalveolar nasal
m͇	Voiced labioalveolar nasal
p᫨	Voiceless labioalveolar plosive
b͇	Voiced labioalveolar plosive
f͇	Voiceless labioalveolar fricative
v͇	Voiced labioalveolar fricative

== See also ==
- Alveolar consonant
- Labial consonant
