= Voiceless labiodental fricative =

Consonantal sound represented by ⟨f⟩ in IPA

f
- IPA number: 128

Audio sample
- source · help

Encoding
- Entity (decimal): &#102;
- Unicode (hex): U+0066
- X-SAMPA: f
- Braille: ⠋ (braille pattern dots-124)
Image

A voiceless labiodental fricative is a type of consonantal sound used in a number of spoken languages. It is familiar to English-speakers as the "f" sound in "face". The symbol in the International Phonetic Alphabet that represents this sound is ⟨f⟩.

== Features ==
Features of a voiceless labiodental fricative:

- Its manner of articulation is fricative, which means it is produced by constricting air flow through a narrow channel at the place of articulation, causing turbulence.
- Its place of articulation is labiodental, which means it is articulated with the lower lip and the upper teeth.
- Its phonation is voiceless, which means it is produced without vibrations of the vocal cords.
- It is an oral consonant, which means that air is not allowed to escape through the nose.
- Because the sound is not produced with airflow over the tongue, the median–lateral dichotomy does not apply.
- Its airstream mechanism is pulmonic, which means it is articulated by pushing air only with the intercostal muscles and abdominal muscles, as in most speech sounds.

== Occurrence ==
Language		Word	IPA	Meaning	Notes
Abkhaz		фы/fy	[fə]	'lightning'	See Abkhaz phonology
Adyghe		тфы/tfy	[tfə]	'five'	Corresponds to [xʷ] in Kabardian and Proto-Circassian
Albanian		faqe	[facɛ]	'cheek'	
Arabic	Modern Standard	ظرف/th'arf	[ðˤɑrf]	'envelope'	See Arabic phonology
Armenian	Eastern	ֆուտբոլ/futbol	[fut̪bol]	'football'	
Assyrian		ܦܬܐ pata	[fɔθɔ]	'face'	Used mostly by Western speakers; corresponds to /p/ in most other dialects.
Assamese		বৰফ/borof	[bɔɹɔf]	'snow/ice'	
Azeri		tüfəng	[t̪y̆fæɲɟ]	'ɡun'	
Basque		fin	[fin]	'thin'	
Bengali		ফ়্যান	[fæn]	'fan'	Only occurs in loanwords. See Bengali phonology
Catalan		fort	[ˈfɔɾt̪]	'strong'	See Catalan phonology
Chechen		факс / faks	[faks]	'fax'	Used only in loanwords. There is no /f/ in Chechen; /f/ was replaced by /p/ in loanwords that contained it before increased influence from the Russian language popularized the usage of /f/.
Chinese	Cantonese	飛 / fēi	[fei̯˥]	'to fly'	See Cantonese phonology
Chinese	Mandarin	飛 (traditional) / 飞(simplified) / fēi	[feɪ̯˥]	'to fly'	See Mandarin phonology
Coptic		ϥⲧⲟⲟⲩ/ftoow	[ftow]	'four'	
Czech		foukat	[ˈfoukat]	'to blow'	See Czech phonology
Dutch		fiets	[fiːts]	'bike'	See Dutch phonology
English	All dialects	fill	[fɪɫ]	'fill'	See English phonology
English	Cockney	think	[fɪŋk]	'think'	Socially marked, with speakers exhibiting some free variation with [θ] (with which it corresponds to in other dialects). See th-fronting.
English	Many British urban dialects	think	[fɪŋk]	'think'	Socially marked, with speakers exhibiting some free variation with [θ] (with which it corresponds to in other dialects). See th-fronting.
English	Some younger East Anglian English	think	[fɪŋk]	'think'	Socially marked, with speakers exhibiting some free variation with [θ] (with which it corresponds to in other dialects). See th-fronting.
English	Some younger New Zealanders	think	[fɪŋk]	'think'	Socially marked, with speakers exhibiting some free variation with [θ] (with which it corresponds to in other dialects). See th-fronting.
English	Broad South African	myth	[mɨf]	'myth'	Possible realization of /θ/, more common word-finally. See White SAE phonology.
Esperanto		fajro	[ˈfajɾo]	'fire'	See Esperanto phonology
Ewe		eflen	[éflé̃]	'he spit off'	
French		fabuleuse	[fäbyˈløːz̪]	'fabulous'	See French phonology
Galician		faísca	[faˈiska]	'spark'	See Galician phonology
German		fade	[ˈfaːdə]	'bland'	See Standard German phonology
Goemai		f'at'	[fat]	'to blow'	
Greek		φύση / fysī	[ˈfisi]	'nature'	See Modern Greek phonology
Gujarati		ફળ / faļ	[fəɭ]	'fruit'	See Gujarati phonology
Hebrew		סופר/sofer	[so̞fe̞ʁ]	'writer'	See Modern Hebrew phonology
Hindustani		साफ़ / صاف/saaf	[sɑːf]	'clean'	See Hindustani phonology
Hmong		𖬌𖬜𖬵 / foob	[fõ˦]	'to sue, to indict'	
Hungarian		figyel	[ˈfiɟɛl]	'he/she pays attention'	See Hungarian phonology
Indonesian		sifat	[ˈsifät̪̚]	'characteristic'	
Italian		fantasma	[fän̪ˈt̪äzmä]	'ghost'	See Italian phonology
Kabardian		фыз/fyz	[fəz]	'woman'	Corresponds to [ʂʷ] in Adyghe and Proto-Circassian
Kabyle		afus	[afus]		
Kazakh		faqır / фақыр	[faqr]	'poor'	
Khmer		កាហ្វេ / kahvé	[kaːfeː]	'coffee'	See Khmer phonology
Macedonian		фонетика/fonetika	[fɔnetika]	'phonetics'	See Macedonian phonology
Māori		whakapapa	[fakapapa]	'genealogy'	Less commonly [ɸ]. See Māori phonology.
Malay		feri	[feri]	'ferry'	Only occurs in loanwords
Malayalam		ഫലം/falam	[fɐlɐm]	'fruit, result'	Only occurs in loanwords in the standard version. ഫ is used to represent both /pʰ/ and /f/ but nowadays most people pronounce /pʰ/ as [f]. Occurs in native words in the Jeseri dialect. See Malayalam phonology
Maltese		fenek	[fenek]	'rabbit'	
Norwegian		filter	[filtɛɾ]	'filter'	See Norwegian phonology
Persian		فروخت/foruxt	[foɹu:xt]	'he/she sold'	See Persian phonology
Polish		futro	[ˈfut̪rɔ]	'fur'	See Polish phonology
Portuguese		fala	[ˈfalɐ]	'speech'	See Portuguese phonology
Punjabi		ਫ਼ੌਜੀ/faujī	[fɔːd͡ʒi]	'soldier'	
Romanian		foc	[fo̞k]	'fire'	See Romanian phonology
Russian		орфография/orfografiya	[ɐrfɐˈɡrafʲɪjə]	'orthography'	Contrasts with palatalized form. See Russian phonology
Scottish Gaelic		faisg	[faʃkʲ]	'near, close'	Loosely articulated, can resemble [ɸ]. See Scottish Gaelic phonology
Serbo-Croatian		фаза / faza	[fǎːz̪ä]	'phase'	See Serbo-Croatian phonology
Slovak		fúkať	[ˈfu̞ːkäc]	'to blow'	See Slovak phonology
Slovene	Standard	flavta	[ˈfláːu̯t̪à]	'flute'	See Slovene phonology
Slovene	Some dialects	vsi	[ˈfs̪î]	'all (people)'	Allophone of /v/ before voiceless obstruents in dialects with /ʋ/ → /v/ development. See Slovene phonology
Somali		feex	[fɛħ]	'wart'	See Somali phonology
Spanish		fantasma	[fã̠n̪ˈt̪a̠zma̠]	'ghost'	See Spanish phonology
Swahili		kufa	[kufɑ]	'to die'	
Swedish		fisk	[ˈfɪsk]	'fish'	See Swedish phonology
Thai		ฝน/fon	[fon˩˩˦]	'rain'	
Toda		nes̲of	[nes̲of]	'moon'	
Turkish		saf	[ˈs̟ɑf]	'pure'	See Turkish phonology
Ukrainian		Фастів/fastiv	[ˈfɑsʲtʲiw]	'Fastiv'	See Ukrainian phonology
Vietnamese		pháo	[faːw˧ˀ˥]	'firecracker'	See Vietnamese phonology
Welsh		ffon	[fɔn]	'stick'	See Welsh phonology
West Frisian		fol	[foɫ]	'full'	See West Frisian phonology
Yi		ꃚ / fu	[fu˧]	'roast'	
Zapotec	Tilquiapan	cafe	[kafɘ]	'coffee'	Used primarily in loanwords from Spanish

=== Voiceless labiodental approximant ===
Voiceless labiodental approximant

ʋ̥

f̞

Audio sample
- source · help

A voiceless labiodental approximant is a similar sound but with less turbulent airflow. It is transcribed in IPA as ⟨ʋ̥⟩.

Language		Word	IPA	Meaning	Notes
English	Indian South African	fair	[ʋ̥eː]	'fair'	Described as an approximant. Corresponds to [f] in other accents.

== Voiceless dentolabial fricative ==
Voiceless dentolabial fricative

f͆

Audio sample
- source · help

A voiceless dentolabial fricative is a type of consonantal sound used in some dialects of Greenlandic.

Whereas a typical voiceless labiodental fricative [f] is articulated with the upper teeth contacting the lower lip, a voiceless dentolabial fricative [f͆] is articulated in the inverse direction, with the lower teeth contacting the upper lip. While the IPA has no symbol to transcribe this distinction, the extIPA uses the diacritic ⟨◌͆⟩ (the above variant of the traditional IPA symbol for dentalization ⟨◌̪⟩) to indicate dentolabial articulation in the context of labial consonants. This sound can therefore be transcribed with the symbol ⟨f͆⟩, as is used in the context of this article.

=== Features ===
The features of a voiceless dentolabial fricative are:

- Its manner of articulation is fricative, which means it is produced by constricting air flow through a narrow channel at the place of articulation, causing turbulence.
- Its place of articulation is dentolabial, which means it is articulated with the upper lip and the lower teeth.
- Its phonation is voiceless, which means it is produced without vibrations of the vocal cords. In some languages the vocal cords are actively separated, so it is always voiceless; in others the cords are lax, so that it may take on the voicing of adjacent sounds.
- It is an oral consonant, which means that air is not allowed to escape through the nose.
- Because the sound is not produced with airflow over the tongue, the median–lateral dichotomy does not apply.
- Its airstream mechanism is pulmonic, which means it is articulated by pushing air only with the intercostal muscles and abdominal muscles, as in most speech sounds.

=== Occurrence ===
Language		Word	IPA	Meaning	Notes
Greenlandic	Qassimiut	tassa aajufffa	[tasːa aːjuf͆ːˠa]	'there it is'	/ʁv/ and geminate /vː/ are pronounced as dento-labial [f͆ː] in some southern dialects. See Greenlandic phonology.

== See also ==
- List of phonetics topics

== Notes ==
Place →	Labial					Coronal										Dorsal					Laryngeal			
Manner ↓	Bilabial		Labiodental		Linguolabial		Dental		Alveolar		Postalveolar		Retroflex		(Alveolo-)palatal		Velar		Uvular		Pharyngeal/epiglottal		Glottal	
Nasal	m̥	m	ɱ̊	ɱ		n̼	n̪̊	n̪	n̥	n	n̠̊	n̠	ɳ̊	ɳ	ɲ̊	ɲ	ŋ̊	ŋ	ɴ̥	ɴ				
Plosive	p	b	p̪	b̪	t̼	d̼	t̪	d̪	t	d			ʈ	ɖ	c	ɟ	k	ɡ	q	ɢ	ʡ		ʔ	
Sibilant affricate							t̪s̪	d̪z̪	ts	dz	t̠ʃ	d̠ʒ	tʂ	dʐ	tɕ	dʑ								
Non-sibilant affricate	pɸ	bβ	p̪f	b̪v			t̪θ	d̪ð	tɹ̝̊	dɹ̝	t̠ɹ̠̊˔	d̠ɹ̠˔			cç	ɟʝ	kx	ɡɣ	qχ	ɢʁ	ʡʜ	ʡʢ	ʔh	
Sibilant fricative							s̪	z̪	s	z	ʃ	ʒ	ʂ	ʐ	ɕ	ʑ								
Non-sibilant fricative	ɸ	β	f	v	θ̼	ð̼	θ	ð	θ̠	ð̠	ɹ̠̊˔	ɹ̠˔	ɻ̊˔	ɻ˔	ç	ʝ	x	ɣ	χ	ʁ	ħ	ʕ	h	ɦ
Approximant		β̞		ʋ				ð̞		ɹ		ɹ̠		ɻ		j		ɰ						˷
Tap/flap		ⱱ̟		ⱱ					ɾ̥	ɾ			ɽ̊	ɽ						ɢ̆		ʡ̆		
Trill	ʙ̥	ʙ							r̥	r		r̠	ɽ̊r̥	ɽr					ʀ̥	ʀ	ʜ	ʢ		
Lateral affricate									tɬ	dɮ			tꞎ	d𝼅	c𝼆	ɟʎ̝	k𝼄	ɡʟ̝						
Lateral fricative							ɬ̪		ɬ	ɮ			ꞎ	𝼅	𝼆	ʎ̝	𝼄	ʟ̝						
Lateral approximant								l̪	l̥	l		l̠	ɭ̊	ɭ	ʎ̥	ʎ	ʟ̥	ʟ		ʟ̠				
Lateral tap/flap									ɺ̥	ɺ			𝼈̊	𝼈		ʎ̆		ʟ̆						

		BL	LD	D	A	PA	RF	P	V	U
Implosive	Voiced	ɓ			ɗ		ᶑ	ʄ	ɠ	ʛ
Implosive	Voiceless	ɓ̥			ɗ̥		ᶑ̊	ʄ̊	ɠ̊	ʛ̥
Ejective	Stop	pʼ			tʼ		ʈʼ	cʼ	kʼ	qʼ
Ejective	Affricate		p̪fʼ	tθʼ	tsʼ	tʃʼ	tʂʼ	tɕʼ	kxʼ	qχʼ
Ejective	Fricative	ɸʼ	fʼ	θʼ	sʼ	ʃʼ	ʂʼ	ɕʼ	xʼ	χʼ
Ejective	Lateral affricate				tɬʼ			c𝼆ʼ	k𝼄ʼ	q𝼄ʼ
Ejective	Lateral fricative				ɬʼ					
Click (top: velar; bottom: uvular)	Tenuis	kʘ qʘ		kǀ qǀ	kǃ qǃ		k𝼊 q𝼊	kǂ qǂ		
Click (top: velar; bottom: uvular)	Voiced	ɡʘ ɢʘ		ɡǀ ɢǀ	ɡǃ ɢǃ		ɡ𝼊 ɢ𝼊	ɡǂ ɢǂ		
Click (top: velar; bottom: uvular)	Nasal	ŋʘ ɴʘ		ŋǀ ɴǀ	ŋǃ ɴǃ		ŋ𝼊 ɴ𝼊	ŋǂ ɴǂ	ʞ	
Click (top: velar; bottom: uvular)	Tenuis lateral				kǁ qǁ					
Click (top: velar; bottom: uvular)	Voiced lateral				ɡǁ ɢǁ					
Click (top: velar; bottom: uvular)	Nasal lateral				ŋǁ ɴǁ					
