= S͎ =

Whistled voiceless alveolar fricative sound

s͎ (an s with an upward-pointing arrow beneath it) is a symbol used in the Extensions to the International Phonetic Alphabet to represent a whistled version of the voiceless alveolar fricative [s].

== Occurrences in language ==
Few languages include this sound as a linguistic phoneme, and data about the extent of its use is limited. It has been documented primarily in some Southern Bantu languages in Sub-Saharan Africa (specifically the Shona and Tswa-Ronga language groups). Some authors have proposed that the sound also occurs in the Tabasaran language in the Caucasus, and Shehri language in Oman, but this is disputed.

In the Shona language, [s͎] is represented orthographically by sv, as in the name of Morgan Tsvangirai. The key acoustic differences between the whistled [s͎] and the non-whistled [s] are that [s͎] has a secondary spectral peak at approximately 3 kHz, and a narrower spectral peak bandwidth.

== Occurrences in disordered speech ==
Whistling also occurs as an undesired occurrence when attempting to make a non-whistled sibilant in languages without whistled sibilants. The same symbol is used, as part of the extIPA, to transcribe speech that erroneously contains a whistle. This can occur for various reasons, including orthodontic prostheses.

== Unicode ==
s͎ is represented in Unicode by an s and U+034E (Combining Upwards Arrow Below).
