= Dental consonant =

Consonant that is articulated with the tongue against the upper teeth

Dental

◌̪

◌͆
- IPA number: 408

Encoding
- Entity (decimal): &#810;
- Unicode (hex): U+032A
Image

A dental consonant is a consonant articulated with the tongue against the upper teeth, such as /θ/, /ð/. In some languages, dentals are distinguished from other groups, such as alveolar consonants, in which the tongue contacts the gum ridge. Dental consonants share acoustic similarity and in the Latin script are generally written with consistent symbols (e.g. t, d, n).

In the International Phonetic Alphabet, the diacritic for dental consonant is U+032A ◌̪ COMBINING BRIDGE BELOW. When there is no room under the letter, it may be placed above, using the character U+0346 ◌͆ COMBINING BRIDGE ABOVE, such as in /p͆/. However, this has a different meaning in the Extensions to the IPA, where it represents dentolabials.

== Cross-linguistically ==
In languages such as Albanian, Irish and Russian, velarization is generally associated with more dental articulations of coronal consonants. Thus, velarized consonants, such as Albanian /ɫ/, tend to be dental or denti-alveolar, and non-velarized consonants tend to be retracted to an alveolar position.

Sanskrit, Hindustani and all other Indo-Aryan languages have an entire set of dental stops that occur phonemically as voiced and voiceless and with or without aspiration. The nasal /n/ also exists but is quite alveolar and apical in articulation. To native speakers, the English alveolar /t/ and /d/ sound more like the corresponding retroflex consonants of their languages than like dentals.

Spanish /t/ and /d/ are denti-alveolar, while /l/ and /n/ are prototypically alveolar but assimilate to the place of articulation of a following consonant. Likewise, Italian /t/, /d/, /t͡s/, /d͡z/ are denti-alveolar ([t̪], [d̪], [t̪͡s̪], and [d̪͡z̪] respectively) and /l/ and /n/ become denti-alveolar before a following dental consonant.

Although denti-alveolar consonants are often described as dental, it is the point of contact farthest to the back that is most relevant, defines the maximum acoustic space of resonance and gives a characteristic sound to a consonant. In French, the contact that is farthest back is alveolar or sometimes slightly pre-alveolar.

== Occurrence ==
Dental/denti-alveolar consonants as transcribed by the International Phonetic Alphabet include:

IPA	Description	Example			
IPA	Description	Language	Orthography	IPA	Meaning
n̪	dental nasal	Russian	наш/naš	[n̪aʂ]	'our'
t̪	voiceless dental plosive	Finnish	tutti	[t̪ut̪ːi]	'pacifier'
d̪	voiced dental plosive	Arabic	دين / din	[d̪iːn]	'religion'
s̪	voiceless dental sibilant fricative	Polish	kosa	[kɔs̪a]	'scythe'
z̪	voiced dental sibilant fricative	Polish	koza	[kɔz̪a]	'goat'
θ	voiceless dental nonsibilant fricative (also often called "interdental")	English	thing	[θɪŋ]	
ð	voiced dental nonsibilant fricative (also often called "interdental")	English	this	[ðɪs]	
ð̞	dental approximant	Spanish	codo	[koð̞o]	'elbow'
l̪	dental lateral approximant	Spanish	alto	[al̪t̪o]	'tall'
t̪ʼ	dental ejective	Dahalo		[t̪ʼat̪t̪a]	'hair'
ɗ̪	voiced dental implosive	Sindhi	ڏسڻي	[ɗ̪əsɪɳiː]	'forefinger'
k͡ǀ q͡ǀ ɡ͡ǀ ɢ͡ǀ ŋ͡ǀ ɴ͡ǀ	dental clicks (many different consonants)	Xhosa	ukúcola	[ukʼúkǀola]	'to grind fine'

== See also ==
- Denti-alveolar consonant
- Place of articulation
- Index of phonetics articles

== Sources ==
- Ladefoged, Peter; Maddieson, Ian (1996). The Sounds of the World's Languages. Oxford: Blackwell. ISBN 0-631-19815-6.
- Martínez-Celdrán, Eugenio; Fernández-Planas, Ana Ma.; Carrera-Sabaté, Josefina (2003), "Castilian Spanish", Journal of the International Phonetic Association, 33 (2): 255–259, doi:10.1017/S0025100303001373, archived from the original on 2021-08-17
- Recasens, Daniel; Espinosa, Aina (2005), "Articulatory, positional and coarticulatory characteristics for clear /l/ and dark /l/: evidence from two Catalan dialects", Journal of the International Phonetic Association, 35 (1): 1–25, doi:10.1017/S0025100305001878, S2CID 14140079
- Rogers, Derek; d'Arcangeli, Luciana (2004), "Italian", Journal of the International Phonetic Association, 34 (1): 117–121, doi:10.1017/S0025100304001628
- Real Academia Española; Association of Spanish Language Academies (2011), Nueva Gramática de la lengua española (English: New Grammar of the Spanish Language), vol. 3 (Fonética y fonología), Espasa, ISBN 978-84-670-3321-2

Place →	Labial					Coronal										Dorsal					Laryngeal			
Manner ↓	Bilabial		Labiodental		Linguolabial		Dental		Alveolar		Postalveolar		Retroflex		(Alveolo-)palatal		Velar		Uvular		Pharyngeal/epiglottal		Glottal	
Nasal	m̥	m	ɱ̊	ɱ		n̼	n̪̊	n̪	n̥	n	n̠̊	n̠	ɳ̊	ɳ	ɲ̊	ɲ	ŋ̊	ŋ	ɴ̥	ɴ				
Plosive	p	b	p̪	b̪	t̼	d̼	t̪	d̪	t	d			ʈ	ɖ	c	ɟ	k	ɡ	q	ɢ	ʡ		ʔ	
Sibilant affricate							t̪s̪	d̪z̪	ts	dz	t̠ʃ	d̠ʒ	tʂ	dʐ	tɕ	dʑ								
Non-sibilant affricate	pɸ	bβ	p̪f	b̪v			t̪θ	d̪ð	tɹ̝̊	dɹ̝	t̠ɹ̠̊˔	d̠ɹ̠˔			cç	ɟʝ	kx	ɡɣ	qχ	ɢʁ	ʡʜ	ʡʢ	ʔh	
Sibilant fricative							s̪	z̪	s	z	ʃ	ʒ	ʂ	ʐ	ɕ	ʑ								
Non-sibilant fricative	ɸ	β	f	v	θ̼	ð̼	θ	ð	θ̠	ð̠	ɹ̠̊˔	ɹ̠˔	ɻ̊˔	ɻ˔	ç	ʝ	x	ɣ	χ	ʁ	ħ	ʕ	h	ɦ
Approximant		β̞		ʋ				ð̞		ɹ		ɹ̠		ɻ		j		ɰ						˷
Tap/flap		ⱱ̟		ⱱ					ɾ̥	ɾ			ɽ̊	ɽ						ɢ̆		ʡ̆		
Trill	ʙ̥	ʙ							r̥	r		r̠	ɽ̊r̥	ɽr					ʀ̥	ʀ	ʜ	ʢ		
Lateral affricate									tɬ	dɮ			tꞎ	d𝼅	c𝼆	ɟʎ̝	k𝼄	ɡʟ̝						
Lateral fricative							ɬ̪		ɬ	ɮ			ꞎ	𝼅	𝼆	ʎ̝	𝼄	ʟ̝						
Lateral approximant								l̪	l̥	l		l̠	ɭ̊	ɭ	ʎ̥	ʎ	ʟ̥	ʟ		ʟ̠				
Lateral tap/flap									ɺ̥	ɺ			𝼈̊	𝼈		ʎ̆		ʟ̆						

		BL	LD	D	A	PA	RF	P	V	U
Implosive	Voiced	ɓ			ɗ		ᶑ	ʄ	ɠ	ʛ
Implosive	Voiceless	ɓ̥			ɗ̥		ᶑ̊	ʄ̊	ɠ̊	ʛ̥
Ejective	Stop	pʼ			tʼ		ʈʼ	cʼ	kʼ	qʼ
Ejective	Affricate		p̪fʼ	t̪θʼ	tsʼ	t̠ʃʼ	tʂʼ	tɕʼ	kxʼ	qχʼ
Ejective	Fricative	ɸʼ	fʼ	θʼ	sʼ	ʃʼ	ʂʼ	ɕʼ	xʼ	χʼ
Ejective	Lateral affricate				tɬʼ			c𝼆ʼ	k𝼄ʼ	q𝼄ʼ
Ejective	Lateral fricative				ɬʼ					
Click (top: velar; bottom: uvular)	Tenuis	kʘ qʘ		kǀ qǀ	kǃ qǃ		k𝼊 q𝼊	kǂ qǂ		
Click (top: velar; bottom: uvular)	Voiced	ɡʘ ɢʘ		ɡǀ ɢǀ	ɡǃ ɢǃ		ɡ𝼊 ɢ𝼊	ɡǂ ɢǂ		
Click (top: velar; bottom: uvular)	Nasal	ŋʘ ɴʘ		ŋǀ ɴǀ	ŋǃ ɴǃ		ŋ𝼊 ɴ𝼊	ŋǂ ɴǂ	ʞ	
Click (top: velar; bottom: uvular)	Tenuis lateral				kǁ qǁ					
Click (top: velar; bottom: uvular)	Voiced lateral				ɡǁ ɢǁ					
Click (top: velar; bottom: uvular)	Nasal lateral				ŋǁ ɴǁ					
