= Dentolabial consonant =

Consonants articulated with the upper lip and the lower teeth

Dentolabial

◌͆

Encoding
- Entity (decimal): &#838;
- Unicode (hex): U+0346
Image

In phonetics, dentolabial consonants are the articulatory opposite of labiodentals: They are pronounced by contacting lower teeth against the upper lip. The diacritic for dentolabial in the extensions of the IPA for disordered speech is a superscript bridge, ⟨◌͆⟩, by analogy with the subscript bridge used for labiodentals: thus ⟨m͆ p͆ b͆ f͆ v͆⟩. These are rare cross-linguistically in non-disordered speech, likely due to the prevalence of dental malocclusions (especially retrognathism) that make them difficult to produce, though the voiceless dentolabial fricative [f͆] is used in some of the southwestern dialects of Greenlandic.

== Dentolabial consonants in the extIPA ==
The dentolabial consonants listed on the extIPA chart are the following. Complex consonants such as affricates, prenasalized stops and the like are also possible.

The only dentolabial consonant attested in non-disordered speech is the voiceless dentolabial fricative [f͆].

IPA	Description	Example				Notes
IPA	Description	Language	Orthography	IPA	Meaning	Notes
m̥͆	voiceless dentolabial nasal	found in disordered speech				
m͆	voiced dentolabial nasal	found in disordered speech				
p͆	voiceless dentolabial plosive	found in disordered speech				
b͆	voiced dentolabial plosive	found in disordered speech				
f͆	voiceless dentolabial fricative	Qassimiut Greenlandic	tassa aajufffa	[tasːa aːjuf͆ːˠa]	'there it is'	[f͆ːˠ] corresponds to /fː/ and /χf/ in the standard language
v͆	voiced dentolabial fricative	found in disordered speech				

== Bibliography ==
- Vebæk, Mâliâraq (2006). The southernmost People of Greenland-Dialects and Memories. Monographs on Greenland. Vol. 337. doi:10.26530/OAPEN_342373. ISBN 978-87-635-1273-2.
