= Extensions to the International Phonetic Alphabet =

Disordered speech additions to the phonetic alphabet

Extended IPA Chart for Disordered Speech, as of 2025

The Extensions to the International Phonetic Alphabet for Disordered Speech, commonly abbreviated extIPA /ɛkˈstaɪpə/, are a set of letters and diacritics devised by the 1989 Kiel Convention and later by the International Clinical Phonetics and Linguistics Association (ICPLA) to augment the International Phonetic Alphabet for the phonetic transcription of disordered speech. Some of its symbols are also used to represent features of normal speech in IPA transcriptions, and are accepted for that purpose by the International Phonetic Association. (Note: For example, the !Xoon pre-voiced ejective ⟨ˬɡ̥xʼ⟩ in Bennett 2020, p. 102)

Many sounds found only in disordered speech are indicated with diacritics, though an increasing number of dedicated letters are used as well. Special letters are included to transcribe the speech of people with lisps and cleft palates. The extIPA repeats several traditional IPA diacritics that the ICPLA has found are unfamiliar to most speech pathologists but which transcribe features that are common in disordered speech. These include preaspiration ⟨ʰ◌⟩, linguolabials ⟨◌̼⟩, laminal fricatives [s̻, z̻], and ⟨*⟩ for a sound (segment or feature) that has no available symbol (letter or diacritic). The novel transcription ⟨ɹ̈⟩ is used for an English molar-r, as opposed to ⟨ɹ̺⟩ for an apical r; these articulations are acoustically indistinguishable and so are rarely identified in non-disordered speech.

Sounds restricted to disordered speech include velopharyngeals, nasal fricatives (a.k.a. nareal fricatives) and some of the percussive consonants. Sounds sometimes found in the world's languages that do not have symbols in the basic IPA include denasals, the sublaminal percussive, palatal and velar lateral fricatives, and fricatives that are simultaneously lateral and sibilant.

There are two basic approaches to transcription in extIPA. One is to transcribe speech phonetically, without considering what the intended sounds are. For example, if a target sound /m/ is denasalized to [b], it is written ⟨b⟩. The other approach is to transcribe the target sound with diacritics to indicate how it is mispronounced. With this approach, denasalized /m/ is written ⟨m͊⟩, with the denasalization diacritic ⟨◌͊⟩. This semi-phonemic approach is very common in the literature, but the ICPLA tries to discourage it. For this reason, in 2025 they specified the denasalization diacritic as meaning partially denasalized.

The extIPA was substantially revised and expanded in 2015; the new symbols were added to Unicode in 2021. Two diacritics were changed in 2024 to reduce ambiguity. (See History of the International Phonetic Alphabet § ExtIPA.)

== Letters ==
The non-IPA letters found in the extIPA are listed in the following table. VoQS letters may also be used, as in ⟨ↀ͡r̪͆⟩ for a buccal interdental trill (a raspberry), as VoQS started off as a subset of extIPA.

Several letters and superscript forms were added to Unicode 14 and 15. They are included in the free Gentium and Andika fonts.

Category	Letter	Superscript and example		Unicode	Description
Lateral	ʪ	𐞙	[t𐞙]	U+02AA, U+10799	Voiceless grooved lateral alveolar fricative, [ɬ͡s] (a laterally lisped /s/, with simultaneous airflow through the sibilant groove in the tongue and across the side of the tongue), intended for a lateral lisp
Lateral	ʫ	𐞚	[d𐞚]	U+02AB, U+1079A	Voiced grooved lateral alveolar fricative, [ɮ͡z] (a laterally lisped /z/)
Lateral	ꞎ	𐞝	[ʈ𐞝]	U+A78E, U+1079D	Voiceless retroflex lateral fricative, implicit in standard IPA.
Lateral	𝼅	𐞟	[ɖ𐞟]	U+1DF05, U+1079F	Voiced retroflex lateral fricative, implicit in standard IPA.
Lateral	𝼆	𐞡	[c𐞡]	U+1DF06, U+107A1	Voiceless palatal lateral fricative. The voiced fricative may be ⟨𝼆⟩ or, in standard IPA, ⟨ʎ̝⟩.
Lateral	𝼄	𐞜	[k𐞜]	U+1DF04, U+1079C	Voiceless velar lateral fricative. The voiced fricative may be ⟨𝼄̬⟩ or, in standard IPA, ⟨ʟ̝⟩.
Velopharyngeal	ʩ	𐞐	[s𐞐]	U+02A9, U+10790	Voiceless velopharyngeal fricative (often occurs with a cleft palate). The voiced fricative is ⟨ʩ̬⟩.
Velopharyngeal	𝼀	𐞐𐞪	[s𐞐𐞪]	U+1DF00, (U+10790+107AA)	Voiceless velopharyngeal trill or 'snort'. (Velopharyngeal fricative accompanied by uvular trill. [𝼀] may be equivalent to [ʩ𐞪].)
Velodorsal	𝼃	–		U+1DF03	Voiceless velodorsal plosive. (The old IPA letter for a velar click, ⟨ʞ⟩, was provided for a voiceless velodorsal plosive from 2008 to 2015.)
Velodorsal	𝼁	–		U+1DF01	Voiced velodorsal plosive
Velodorsal	𝼇	–		U+1DF07	Velodorsal nasal
Pharyngeal	ꞯ	–		U+A7AF	Voiceless upper-pharyngeal plosive [q̠]
Pharyngeal	𝼂	–		U+1DF02	Voiced upper-pharyngeal plosive [ɢ̠]
Percussive	ʬ	( ᷱᷱ )		U+02AC	Bilabial percussive (for lips smacking together; cf. non-percussive [ʬ↓] for lips smacking apart)
Percussive	ʭ	( ͆͆ )		U+02AD	Bidental percussive (gnashing teeth)
Percussive	¡	ꜞ	[ǃꜞ], [ǂꜞ]	U+00A1, U+A71E	Sublaminal lower-alveolar percussive (tongue slap). Used with letters for alveolar and palatal clicks to indicate clicks with percussive release, or "clucks", [ǃ¡] and [ǂ¡].

== Diacritics ==
The extIPA has explicitly endorsed some rarer uses of regular IPA diacritics, such as [ʰp] for pre-aspiration, and has added some new ones, such as [tʶ] for uvularization. Some of these extIPA diacritics are occasionally used for non-disordered speech, for example for the unusual airstream mechanisms of Damin.

One extension of regular IPA is the use of parentheses around diacritics to indicate partial application of that diacritic: a pair of parentheses around a diacritic indicates that the diacritic only partially applies (in degree or duration), while a single parenthesis at the left or right of the diacritic indicates that the segment is partially affected at its beginning or end. These conventions may be convenient for representing various voice onset times. Phonation diacritics may also be prefixed or suffixed to represent relative timing beyond the segment (pre- and post-voicing etc.). The following are examples; in principle, any IPA or extIPA diacritic may be parenthesized or displaced in this manner.

Partial application of diacritics (examples)
s̬᪽	partial/central voicing of [s]	z̥᪽ ʒ̊᪻	partial/central devoicing of [z], [ʒ]	subscript: U+1ABD; superscript: 1ABB
s̬᫃	initial voicing	z̥᫃ ʒ̊᫁	initial devoicing	subscript: U+1AC3; superscript: 1AC1
s̬᫄	final voicing	z̥᫄ ʒ̊᫂	final devoicing	subscript: U+1AC4; superscript: 1AC2
z̤᪽	partial murmuring of [z]	ã᪻	partial nasalization of [a]	
Displaced timing (examples)
ˬz	pre-voiced [z]	zˬ	post-voiced [z]	U+02EC
a˷	[a] with a creaky offglide	p˳	[p] with extended voicelessness	U+02F7 (˷), U+02F3 (˳)

The transcriptions for partial voicing and devoicing may be used in either the sense of degrees of voicing or in the sense that the voicing is discontinuous. For the former, both parentheses indicate the sound is mildly (partially) voiced throughout, and single parentheses mean a partial degree of voicing at the beginning or end of the sound. For the latter, both parentheses mean the sound is (de)voiced in the middle, while the single parentheses mean complete (de)voicing at the beginning or end of the sound. The implication is that such voicing or devoicing is atypical of the language being spoken. For example, ⟨z̥⟩ would be used for the usual devoicing or partial devoicing of the language, while ⟨z̥᪽⟩ would indicate that the transcriber found the devoicing to be atypical, as in pathological speech. Similarly, ⟨z̥᫃⟩ would indicate atypical devoicing at the beginning of the segment. However, some authors use the parentheses for typical devoicing in close transcription. For example, the Bardi word aamba 'man', with the usual initial and final devoicing of that language, has been transcribed [ɐ̥͡ɐmbə̥᫄].

Altering the position of a diacritic relative to the letter indicates that the phonation begins before the consonant or vowel does or continues beyond it. The voiceless ring and other phonation diacritics can be used in the same way if needed. For example, ⟨p˳a⟩ indicates that voicelessness continues past the [p], more or less equivalent to ⟨pʰa⟩.

Other extIPA diacritics are:

Airstream mechanism
ɬ↓, ə↓	U+2193	(after a letter) ingressive airstream	ʘ↑	U+2191	(after a letter) egressive airstream (Note: The up-arrow for egressive airflow is no longer present in the 2016 extIPA chart but is mentioned in the accompanying article.)
↓	U+2193	(in isolation) inhalation	↑	U+2191	(in isolation) exhalation
Phonation
p˭	U+02ED (Note: Distinct from the mathematical superscript equals sign, U+207C ⟨⁼⟩)	unaspirated	ʰp	U+02B0	pre-aspiration
Nasalization
n̾ (Note: The symbol for the nareal fricative ⟨n̾⟩ had been ⟨n͋⟩ prior to 2024, but this had the disadvantage of being visually nearly indistinguishable from the denasal ⟨n͊⟩ at small type sizes.)	U+033E	(on a nasal letter) nareal fricative	s𐞐 (Note: Before 2024 this had also been a double tilde, ⟨s͌⟩, but that potentially conflicted with the occasional IPA use of a double tilde for a high degree of nasalization, as in Palantla Chinantec /ẽ̃/.)	U+10790	velopharyngeal frication (especially noisy nasal airstream caused by turbulent airflow through the velopharyngeal port)
v̾	U+033E	(on an oral letter) nasal fricative escape (audible turbulent airflow through the nostrils, as with a nasal lisp)	m͊	U+034A	partially denasalized (as with a headcold; complements the nasal diacritic)
Articulatory strength
f͈, h͈	U+0348	strong (Note: Also called "tense", for example when describing Korean.) articulation (not necessarily fortis); ⟨h͈⟩ may be used for a true glottal fricative	v͉	U+0349	weak articulation (not necessarily lenis)
Articulation
v͆	U+0346	(on a labial letter) dentolabial	n̪͆	U+0346 +032A	(on a coronal letter) interdental
t͆	U+0346	(on a coronal letter) class-3 occlusion (tongue protrudes past upper teeth, as with a severe underbite)	h̪͆	U+0346 +032A	(on a glottal letter) bidental
s͇	U+0347 (Note: This equal-sign diacritic or double macron needs to be kept distinct from the standard IPA use of a stacked double minus for a highly retracted sound, as in Kwaza [s̠̠]. A double minus may be narrower or have greater vertical spacing than the single diacritic U+0347, depending on the font.)	(on a coronal letter) alveolar (Note: Normally in the IPA, a transcription with a coronal letter, such as [n], is assumed to be alveolar unless a diacritic is added to indicate otherwise (e.g. dental [n̪] or post-alveolar [n̠]). However, a speech pathologist may need to indicate whether the alveolar target is actually achieved, and so may overtly transcribe an alveolar nasal as [n͇].)	s͍	U+034D	labial spreading
f͇	U+0347	(on a labial letter) labioalveolar (class-2 occlusion, as with a severe overbite)	o͍	U+034D	(complements the diacritics for rounding – see rounded vowel) (Note: Occasionally seen on rounded vowel letters to transcribe compressed vowels. This is not an obvious reading of the diacritic and was not the intention of the extIPA.)
s͎	U+034E	whistled	s̻ z̻	U+033B	laminal fricatives (including lowered tongue tip) (Note: The latter could be specified by doubling the diacritic for extra laminal [s̻̻], [z̻̻].)
ɹ̈, ɹ̺	(as IPA)	bunched-r (molar-r) and apical-r, respectively	s͕, s͔	U+0355, U+0354	offset to the left and right, respectively (Note: Although not specified by the extIPA, the offset symbols are generally taken to refer to the interlocutor's left and right, not the speaker's.)
Timing
s͢θ x͢ɕ	U+0362	slurred/sliding articulation (a consonantal diphthong, moving from one articulation to another within the time of a single segment)	p\p\p	U+005C	stutter (reiterated articulation) (Note: Used in the transcription of Damin.)

Diacritics may be placed within parentheses as the voicing diacritics are above. For example, ⟨m͊᪻⟩ indicates a partially denasalized [m].

The arrow for sliding articulation was first used for [wɑət̪s̪͢θ] for 'watch' and [z̪͢ðɪpʊə] for 'zipper'. It is most commonly observed in quick changes from the blade to the tip of the tongue (laminal to apical) in plosives and fricatives, such as [t̪͢t] and [t͢θ], or vice versa, but is not limited to that; the consonants may also be labial or dorsal, e.g. [ɸ͢f] and [k͢q].

The slit-grooved distinction of the channel shape of front fricatives may be handled with these diacritics, with for example ⟨s̪ z̪⟩ for grooved (sibilant) dental fricatives, and ⟨θ͇ ð͇⟩ for ungrooved (non-sibilant) alveolar fricatives. This is a common topic in speech pathology, though ⟨s̪ z̪⟩ occur in non-pathological speech in some languages.

Any IPA letter may be used in superscript form as a diacritic, to indicate the onset, release or 'flavor' of another letter. In extIPA, this is provided specifically for the fricative release of a plosive. For example, ⟨k𐞜⟩ is [k] with a lateral-fricative release (similar to the velar lateral affricate [k͜𝼄], but with less frication); ⟨d𐞚⟩ is [d] with lateral-plus-central release. Combining diacritics can be added to superscript diacritics, such as ⟨tʰ̪͆⟩ for [t] with bidental aspiration.

The VoQS (voice-quality symbols) take IPA and extIPA diacritics, as well as several additional diacritics that are potentially available for extIPA transcription. The subscript dot for 'whisper' is sometimes found in IPA transcription, though in IPA the diacritic has also been used for apical-retroflex articulation.

== Prosodic notation and indeterminate sounds ==
The Extended IPA has adopted bracket notation from conventions transcribing discourse. Parentheses are used to indicate mouthing (silent articulation), as in the common silent sign to hush (ʃːː). Parentheses are also used to indicate silent pauses, for example (...); the length of the pause may be indicated, as in (2.3 sec). A very short (.) may be used to indicate an absence of co-articulation between adjacent segments, for instance [t(.)weɫv̥] rather than [tʷw̥eɫv̥].

Double parentheses indicate that transcription is uncertain because of extraneous noise or speech, as when one person talks over another. As much detail as possible may be included, as in ⸨2 syll.⸩ or ⸨2σ⸩ for two obscured syllables. This is also IPA usage. Sometimes the obscuring noise will be indicated instead, as in ⸨cough⸩ or ⸨knock⸩, as in the illustrative transcription below; this notation may be used for extraneous noise that does not obscure speech, but which the transcriber nonetheless wishes to notate (e.g. because someone says 'excuse me' after coughing, or verbally responds to the knock on the door, and the noise is thus required to understand the speech).

In the extIPA, indistinguishable/unidentifiable sounds are circled rather than placed in single parentheses as in IPA. (Note: Unicode encodes a combining circle diacritic (U+20DD) that will work with any IPA letter, but as of 2026 it is not widely included in fonts. For example, ⟨σ⃝⟩ combines U+20DD with σ to represent an unidentifiable syllable.) An empty circle, ◯, is used for an indeterminate segment, σ an indeterminate syllable, Ⓒ a segment identifiable only as a consonant, etc. Full capital letters, such as C in Ⓒ, are used as wild-cards for certain categories of sounds, and may combine with IPA and extIPA diacritics. For example, P̥ indicates an undetermined or indeterminate voiceless plosive. Regular IPA and extIPA letters may also be circled to indicate that their identification is uncertain. For example, ⓚ indicates that the segment is judged to probably be [k]. This is effectively a copy-edit mark, and may be elongated into an oval for longer strings of symbols. This was illustrated in the 1997 edition of the chart, where the circle was typeset as ( ̲̅) and longer strings as e.g. (a̲̅a̲̅a̲̅). There is no way to typeset this in Unicode that does not require spurious characters between the letters (as here), but for data storage it may be indicated with an unused set of brackets, or with conventions such as ### (three unintelligible syllables) and #word or wo#rd (uncertain hearing) from discourse transcription.

Curly brackets with Italian musical terms are used for phonation and prosodic notation, such as [{_{falsetto} ˈhɛlp _{falsetto}}] and terms for the tempo and dynamics of connected speech. These are subscripted within a {curly brace} notation to indicate that they are comments on the intervening text. The VoQS conventions use similar notation for voice quality. These may be combined, for example with VoQS ⟨F⟩ for 'falsetto':

{_{allegro} I {F {_{𝆏} didn't _{𝆏}} know that F} _{allegro}}

or

[{_{allegro} ə {F {_{𝆏} dɪn _{𝆏}} nəʊ ðæʔ F} _{allegro}}]

Silence
( )	silent articulation: (ʃːː) a silent shhh!						
(.)	short pause	(..)	medium pause	(...)	long pause	(1.2)	1.2-second pause
Prosody
𝆑	loud speech ('forte')	[{_{𝆑} ˈlaʊd _{𝆑}}]		𝆑𝆑	louder speech ('fortissimo')	[{_{𝆑𝆑} ˈlaʊdɚ _{𝆑𝆑}}]	
𝆏	quiet speech ('piano')	[{_{𝆏} ˈkwaɪət _{𝆏}}]		𝆏𝆏	quieter speech ('pianissimo')	[{_{𝆏𝆏} ˈkwaɪətɚ _{𝆏𝆏}}]	
allegro	fast speech	[{_{allegro} ˈfæst _{allegro}}]		lento	slow speech	[{_{lento} ˈsloʊ _{lento}}]	
crescendo, rallentando, and other musical terms may also be used.
Extraneous noise; speech obscured by extraneous noise
⸨ ⸩	⸨2σ⸩ two syllables obscured; ⸨cough⸩ a cough						
Unidentified and partially identified sounds in recordings
◯	segment	Ⓒ	consonant	Ⓕ	fricative	Ⓖ	glide/approximant
Ⓚ (Note: Because a formatting trick has been used here, the symbol cannot be copied and pasted from this table. In a supporting font, the combining circle U+20DD will accept the click wildcard letter ⟨Ʞ⟩, as here: ⟨ Ʞ⃝ ⟩.)	click	Ⓛ	liquid (or lateral)	Ⓝ	nasal	Ⓟ	plosive
Ⓡ	rhotic (or resonant)	Ⓢ	sibilant	Ⓣ	tone/accent/stress	Ⓥ	vowel

== Chart ==
Three rows appear in the extIPA chart that do not occur in the IPA chart: "fricative lateral + median" (simultaneous grooved and lateral frication), "fricative nasal" (a.k.a. nareal fricative) and "percussive". An additional partial denasal row is added below. Several new columns appear as well, though the linguolabial column is produced by a diacritic from the traditional IPA. Dorso-velar and velo-dorsal articulations are combined in this chart.

Consonants not appearing on the standard IPA chart
	bilabial	labiodental	labioalveolar	dentolabial	bidental	linguolabial	interdental	lower alveolar	upper alveolar	retroflex	palatal	velar (velodorsal)	velopharyngeal	upper pharyngeal
Plosive		p̪ b̪	p͇ b͇	p͆ b͆		t̼ d̼	t̪͆ d̪͆	t̻ d̻				(𝼃 𝼁)		ꞯ 𝼂
Partial denasal	m͊								n͊	ɳ͊	ɲ͊	ŋ͊		
Nasal			m͇̊ m͇	m̥͆ m͆		n̼̊ n̼	n̪̥͆ n̪͆	n̻				(𝼇)		
Fricative nasal	m̥̾ m̾	ɱ̥̾ ɱ̾							n̥̾ n̾	ɳ̥̾ ɳ̾	ɲ̥̾ ɲ̾	ŋ̥̾ ŋ̾		
Trill						r̼	r̪͆						𝼀 𝼀̬ (ʩ𐞪)	
Median fricative			f͇ v͇	f͆ v͆	h̪͆ ɦ̪͆	θ̼ ð̼	θ̪͆ ð̪͆	s̻ z̻	θ͇ ð͇				ʩ ʩ̬	
Lateral fricative						ɬ̼ ɮ̼	ɬ̪͆ ɮ̪͆	ɬ̻ ɮ̻		ꞎ 𝼅 (Note: The dorsal lateral fricatives will not display unless you have a supporting font installed, such as the free fonts Gentium or Andika.)	𝼆 𝼆̬	𝼄 𝼄̬		
Mediolateral fricative									ʪ ʫ					
Lateral approximant						l̼	l̪͆	l̻						
Percussive	ʬ				ʭ			¡						

== Superscript variants ==
The customary use of superscript IPA letters is formalized in the extIPA, specifically for fricative releases of plosives, as can be seen with ⟨d𐞞⟩ and ⟨k𐞜⟩ in the lower-left of the full chart.

Speech pathologists often use superscripting to indicate that a target sound has not been reached – for example, [ˈtʃɪᵏən] for an instance of the word 'chicken' where the /k/ is incompletely articulated. However, due to the vague meaning of superscripting in the IPA, this is not a convention supported by the ICPLA. An unambiguous transcription would mark the consonant more specifically as weakened ([ˈtʃɪk͉ən]) or silent ([ˈtʃɪ(k)ən]).

== Sample text ==
A sample transcription of a written text read aloud, using extIPA and Voice Quality Symbols:

[ð\ðːə̤ {V̰ ə\ə\ə V̰} ˈhw̥əɹld ˈkʌp ˈf̆\faɪnəlz əv ˈnaɪntin eəti {↓_{𝑝}ˈtʉ̆_{𝑝}↓} ˌɑɹ ˈh\hɛld ɪn sːp\ˈsːp\ʰeᵊn ˈðɪs jəɹ (3 sec) ð͈ːe wɪl ɪnv\ˈv͈ːɔlv ðə tˢˑ\tʴ̥ (.) {_{𝑝}tʼ\tʼ_{𝑝}} ʩ \ {_{𝑓}ʩ \ ʩ_{𝑓}}\ˈt͈ɒ̆p̚ ˈneʃənz əv ðə ˈwəɹld ɪnˑ ə̰ {_{𝑝𝑝}tʰˑəʃ\t̆ʰə\təʃ_{𝑝𝑝}}\ˈt͈ʉɹnəmənt ˈlastɪn ˌoʊvər ˈfɔɹ ˈwiks (..) ˈh͈ɛld ə\ ʔat ˈf\fɔɹtin (...) {_{𝑝𝑝}V̰ d\d V̰_{𝑝𝑝}} \ ˈdɪfɹənt ˈsɛn{↓təɹʐ↓} ɪn ˈspeᵊn (3 sec) ə̰ (.) ˈɔl əv ðə fˑ\f ˈɔl əv ðə ˈfəɹʂt ˈɹaʉnd ˈɡeᵊmz wɪl bi (..) wɪl bi (.) ɪn ðə (.) w̰̆ə̰ː p\pɹəv\ˈvɪnʃəl {_{𝑝}tʼ\tʼ_{𝑝}} \ {_{𝑝𝑝}tʼ\tʼ_{𝑝𝑝}} (.) tʼ\tʼ (..) {_{𝑝𝑝}tʼ\tʼ_{𝑝𝑝}} ʩ \ ʩ \ {↓ˈtãʉ̃nz↓} wɪð ðə s͢ːsʼ\sʼ\ˈs{↓ɛmi ˈfaɪnəlz↓} and ˈf\faɪnəlz ˈhɛld ɪn (.) ⸨knock on door⸩ bɑɹsə{_{𝑝}ˈloʊnə and ˈmədɹɪd_{𝑝}}]

Original text: "The World Cup Finals of 1982 are held in Spain this year. They will involve the top nations of the World in a tournament lasting over four weeks, held at fourteen different centers in Spain. All of the first-round games will be in the provincial towns with the semi-finals, and finals held in Barcelona and Madrid."

== See also ==
- Voice Quality Symbols
- Sinological phonetic notation
- Phonetic symbols in Unicode

== Bibliography ==
- Ball, Martin J. (1993). "Further to Articulatory Force and the IPA Revisions". Journal of the International Phonetic Association. 23 (1): 39–41. doi:10.1017/S0025100300004783. S2CID 143614464.
- Ball, Martin J.; Esling, John H.; Dickson, Craig (December 1995). "The VoQS System for the Transcription of Voice Quality". Journal of the International Phonetic Association. 25 (2): 71–80. doi:10.1017/S0025100300005181. S2CID 145791575.
- Ball, Martin J.; Howard, Sara J.; Miller, Kirk (2018). "Revisions to the extIPA chart". Journal of the International Phonetic Association. 48 (2): 155–164. doi:10.1017/S0025100317000147. JSTOR 26502601. S2CID 151863976.
- Ball, Martin J.; Lowry, Orla M. (2001). "Transcribing Disordered Speech". Methods in Clinical Phonetics. London: Whurr. pp. 25–40, 80. doi:10.1002/9780470777879.ch3. ISBN 9781861561848. S2CID 58518097.
- Bennett, William G. (2020). "Click Phonology". In Sands, Bonny (ed.). Click Consonants. Empirical Approaches to Linguistic Theory. Vol. 15. Brill. pp. 74–128. doi:10.1163/9789004424357_003. ISBN 978-90-04-23268-6. S2CID 243697259.
- Duckworth, Martin; Allen, George; Hardcastle, William; Ball, Martin J. (1990). "Extensions to the International Phonetic Alphabet for the transcription of atypical speech". Clinical Linguistics and Phonetics. 4 (4). International Clinical Phonetics and Linguistics Association: 273–280. doi:10.3109/02699209008985489.
- Hesselwood, Barry; Howard, Sara (2008). "Clinical Phonetic Transcription". In Ball, Martin J.; Perkins, Michael R.; Müller, Nicole; Howard, Sara (eds.). The handbook of Clinical Linguistics. Malden, MA: Blackwell. doi:10.1002/9781444301007.ch23. ISBN 9781405135221.
- International Phonetic Association (1999). Handbook of the International Phonetic Association : a guide to the use of the International Phonetic Alphabet. Cambridge, UK: Cambridge University Press. ISBN 9780521637510.
- Ladefoged, Peter (1971). Preliminaries to linguistic phonetics. Chicago, IL: University of Chicago Press. ISBN 0-226-46787-2. LCCN 75-179318.
- Laver, John (1994). Principles of phonetics. Cambridge Textbooks in Linguistics. Cambridge, UK: Cambridge University Press. doi:10.1017/CBO9781139166621. ISBN 9781139166621.
- van der Voort, Hein (2005). "Kwaza in a Comparative Perspective". International Journal of American Linguistics. 71 (4). University of Chicago Press: 365–412. doi:10.1086/501245. S2CID 224808983.

Place →	Labial					Coronal										Dorsal					Laryngeal			
Manner ↓	Bilabial		Labiodental		Linguolabial		Dental		Alveolar		Postalveolar		Retroflex		(Alveolo-)palatal		Velar		Uvular		Pharyngeal/epiglottal		Glottal	
Nasal	m̥	m	ɱ̊	ɱ		n̼	n̪̊	n̪	n̥	n	n̠̊	n̠	ɳ̊	ɳ	ɲ̊	ɲ	ŋ̊	ŋ	ɴ̥	ɴ				
Plosive	p	b	p̪	b̪	t̼	d̼	t̪	d̪	t	d			ʈ	ɖ	c	ɟ	k	ɡ	q	ɢ	ʡ		ʔ	
Sibilant affricate							t̪s̪	d̪z̪	ts	dz	t̠ʃ	d̠ʒ	tʂ	dʐ	tɕ	dʑ								
Non-sibilant affricate	pɸ	bβ	p̪f	b̪v			t̪θ	d̪ð	tɹ̝̊	dɹ̝	t̠ɹ̠̊˔	d̠ɹ̠˔			cç	ɟʝ	kx	ɡɣ	qχ	ɢʁ	ʡʜ	ʡʢ	ʔh	
Sibilant fricative							s̪	z̪	s	z	ʃ	ʒ	ʂ	ʐ	ɕ	ʑ								
Non-sibilant fricative	ɸ	β	f	v	θ̼	ð̼	θ	ð	θ̠	ð̠	ɹ̠̊˔	ɹ̠˔	ɻ̊˔	ɻ˔	ç	ʝ	x	ɣ	χ	ʁ	ħ	ʕ	h	ɦ
Approximant		β̞		ʋ				ð̞		ɹ		ɹ̠		ɻ		j		ɰ						˷
Tap/flap		ⱱ̟		ⱱ					ɾ̥	ɾ			ɽ̊	ɽ						ɢ̆		ʡ̆		
Trill	ʙ̥	ʙ							r̥	r		r̠	ɽ̊r̥	ɽr					ʀ̥	ʀ	ʜ	ʢ		
Lateral affricate									tɬ	dɮ			tꞎ	d𝼅	c𝼆	ɟʎ̝	k𝼄	ɡʟ̝						
Lateral fricative							ɬ̪		ɬ	ɮ			ꞎ	𝼅	𝼆	ʎ̝	𝼄	ʟ̝						
Lateral approximant								l̪	l̥	l		l̠	ɭ̊	ɭ	ʎ̥	ʎ	ʟ̥	ʟ		ʟ̠				
Lateral tap/flap									ɺ̥	ɺ			𝼈̊	𝼈		ʎ̆		ʟ̆						

		BL	LD	D	A	PA	RF	P	V	U
Implosive	Voiced	ɓ			ɗ		ᶑ	ʄ	ɠ	ʛ
Implosive	Voiceless	ɓ̥			ɗ̥		ᶑ̊	ʄ̊	ɠ̊	ʛ̥
Ejective	Stop	pʼ			tʼ		ʈʼ	cʼ	kʼ	qʼ
Ejective	Affricate		p̪fʼ	tθʼ	tsʼ	tʃʼ	tʂʼ	tɕʼ	kxʼ	qχʼ
Ejective	Fricative	ɸʼ	fʼ	θʼ	sʼ	ʃʼ	ʂʼ	ɕʼ	xʼ	χʼ
Ejective	Lateral affricate				tɬʼ			c𝼆ʼ	k𝼄ʼ	q𝼄ʼ
Ejective	Lateral fricative				ɬʼ					
Click (top: velar; bottom: uvular)	Tenuis	kʘ qʘ		kǀ qǀ	kǃ qǃ		k𝼊 q𝼊	kǂ qǂ		
Click (top: velar; bottom: uvular)	Voiced	ɡʘ ɢʘ		ɡǀ ɢǀ	ɡǃ ɢǃ		ɡ𝼊 ɢ𝼊	ɡǂ ɢǂ		
Click (top: velar; bottom: uvular)	Nasal	ŋʘ ɴʘ		ŋǀ ɴǀ	ŋǃ ɴǃ		ŋ𝼊 ɴ𝼊	ŋǂ ɴǂ	ʞ	
Click (top: velar; bottom: uvular)	Tenuis lateral				kǁ qǁ					
Click (top: velar; bottom: uvular)	Voiced lateral				ɡǁ ɢǁ					
Click (top: velar; bottom: uvular)	Nasal lateral				ŋǁ ɴǁ					
