= Alveolar consonant =

Consonants articulated with the tongue against or close to the superior alveolar ridge

Alveolar

◌͇

◌᫨

Encoding
- Entity (decimal): &#839;&#6888;
- Unicode (hex): U+0347 U+1AE8
Image

Alveolar consonants (/ælˈviːələr/; UK also /ælviˈoʊlə/) are articulated with the tongue against or close to the superior alveolar ridge, so called because it contains the alveoli (the sockets) of the upper teeth. Alveolar consonants may be articulated with the tip of the tongue (the apical consonants), as in English, or with the flat of the tongue just above the tip (the "blade" of the tongue; called laminal consonants), as in French and Spanish.

The International Phonetic Alphabet (IPA) does not have separate symbols for the alveolar consonants. Rather, the same symbol is used for all coronal places of articulation that are not palatalized like English palato-alveolar sh, or retroflex. To disambiguate, the bridge ([s̪, t̪, n̪, l̪], etc.) may be used for a dental consonant, or the under-bar ([s̠, t̠, n̠, l̠], etc.) may be used for the postalveolars. [s̪] differs from dental [θ] in that the former is a sibilant and the latter is not. [s̠] differs from postalveolar [ʃ] in being unpalatalized.

The bare letters [s, t, n, l], etc. cannot be assumed to specifically represent alveolars. The language may not make such distinctions, such that two or more coronal places of articulation are found allophonically, or the transcription may simply be too broad to distinguish dental from alveolar. If it is necessary to specify a consonant as alveolar, a diacritic from the Extended IPA may be used: [s͇, t͇, n͇, l͇], etc., though that could also mean extra-retracted. The letters ⟨s, t, n, l⟩ are frequently called 'alveolar,' and the examples from the languages below are all alveolar sounds.

(The Extended IPA diacritic was devised for speech pathology and is frequently used to mean "alveolarized", as in the labioalveolar sounds [p͇, b͇, m͇, f͇, v͇], where the lower lip contacts the alveolar ridge.)

== In IPA ==
Alveolar consonants are transcribed in the IPA as follows:

IPA	Description	Example			
IPA	Description	Language	Orthography	IPA	Meaning in English
n̥	voiceless alveolar nasal	Burmese	နှာ	[n̥à]	'nose'
n	voiced alveolar nasal	English	run	[ɹʌn]	
t	voiceless alveolar plosive	English	top	[tɒp]	
d	voiced alveolar plosive	English	debt	[dɛt]	
t͜s	voiceless alveolar affricate	German	Zeit	[t͜saɪt]	time
d͜z	voiced alveolar affricate	Italian	zaino	[ˈd͜zaino]	backpack
s	voiceless alveolar fricative	English	suit	[suːt]	
z	voiced alveolar fricative	English	zoo	[zuː]	
t͜ɬ	voiceless alveolar lateral affricate	Tsez	э'лI'ни	[ˈʔe̞t͜ɬni]	winter
d͜ɮ	voiced alveolar lateral affricate	Pa Na		[d͜ɮau˩˧]	'deep'
ɬ	voiceless alveolar lateral fricative	Welsh	llwyd	[ɬʊɪd]	grey
ɮ	voiced alveolar lateral fricative	Zulu	dlala	[ˈɮálà]	to play
θ̠	voiceless alveolar non-sibilant fricative	Irish English	Italy	[ˈɪθ̠ɪli]	
ð̠	voiced alveolar non-sibilant fricative	Scouse English	maid	[meɪð̠]	
ɹ	voiced alveolar approximant	English	red	[ɹɛd]	
l	alveolar lateral approximant	English	loop	[lup]	
ɫ	velarized alveolar lateral approximant	English	milk	[mɪɫk]	
ɺ̥	voiceless alveolar lateral flap	Karu		[ɺ̥je.ˈtɐ̃.hə͂]	'that'
ɺ	voiced alveolar lateral flap	Venda		[vuɺa]	'to open'
ɾ̥	voiceless alveolar flap	Icelandic	hrafn	[ˈɾ̥apn̪̊]	'raven'
ɾ	voiced alveolar tap	English	better	[ˈbɛɾɚ]	
r̥	voiceless alveolar trill	Konda		[pur̥i]	'anthill'
r	voiced alveolar trill	Spanish	perro	[ˈpero]	'dog'
tʼ	alveolar ejective	Georgian	ტიტა	[tʼitʼa]	'tulip'
t͜sʼ	alveolar ejective affricate	Chechen	цIе	[t͜sʼe]	'name'
sʼ	alveolar ejective fricative	Amharic	ጼጋ	[sʼɛɡa]	
t͜ɬʼ	alveolar lateral ejective affricate	Navajo	tłʼóoʼdi	[t͜ɬʼóːʔtɪ̀]	'(at) the outside'
ɬ’	alveolar lateral ejective fricative	Adyghe	плӀы	[pɬ’ə]	'four'
ƭ	voiceless alveolar implosive	Mam	t'ut'an	[ɗ̥ɯɗ̥aŋ]	'finish'
ɗ	voiced alveolar implosive	Vietnamese	đã	[ɗɐː]	Past tense indicator
k͡ǃ q͡ǃ ɡ͡ǃ ɢ͡ǃ ŋ͡ǃ ɴ͡ǃ	apical alveolar clicks (many distinct consonants)	Nama	!oas	[ᵑ̊ǃˀoas]	hollow
k͡ǁ q͡ǁ ɡ͡ǁ ɢ͡ǁ ŋ͡ǁ ɴ͡ǁ	alveolar lateral clicks (many distinct consonants)	Nama	ǁî	[ᵑ̊ǁˀĩː]	discussed

== Lack of alveolars ==
Northwest Mekeo lacks phonemic coronal consonants but has allophonic [dzʲ, n]. A few languages on Bougainville Island and around Puget Sound, such as Makah, lack nasals and therefore [n] but have [t]. Colloquial Samoan, however, lacks both [t] and [n] but has a lateral alveolar approximant /l/. (Samoan words written with t and n are pronounced with [k] and [ŋ] in colloquial speech.) In Standard Hawaiian, [t] is an allophone of /k/, but /l/ and /n/ exist.

== See also ==
- Index of phonetics articles
- Labioalveolar consonant
- Labial–alveolar consonant
- Perception of English /r/ and /l/ by Japanese speakers
- Place of articulation

Place →	Labial					Coronal										Dorsal					Laryngeal			
Manner ↓	Bilabial		Labiodental		Linguolabial		Dental		Alveolar		Postalveolar		Retroflex		(Alveolo-)palatal		Velar		Uvular		Pharyngeal/epiglottal		Glottal	
Nasal	m̥	m	ɱ̊	ɱ		n̼	n̪̊	n̪	n̥	n	n̠̊	n̠	ɳ̊	ɳ	ɲ̊	ɲ	ŋ̊	ŋ	ɴ̥	ɴ				
Plosive	p	b	p̪	b̪	t̼	d̼	t̪	d̪	t	d			ʈ	ɖ	c	ɟ	k	ɡ	q	ɢ	ʡ		ʔ	
Sibilant affricate							t̪s̪	d̪z̪	ts	dz	t̠ʃ	d̠ʒ	tʂ	dʐ	tɕ	dʑ								
Non-sibilant affricate	pɸ	bβ	p̪f	b̪v			t̪θ	d̪ð	tɹ̝̊	dɹ̝	t̠ɹ̠̊˔	d̠ɹ̠˔			cç	ɟʝ	kx	ɡɣ	qχ	ɢʁ	ʡʜ	ʡʢ	ʔh	
Sibilant fricative							s̪	z̪	s	z	ʃ	ʒ	ʂ	ʐ	ɕ	ʑ								
Non-sibilant fricative	ɸ	β	f	v	θ̼	ð̼	θ	ð	θ̠	ð̠	ɹ̠̊˔	ɹ̠˔	ɻ̊˔	ɻ˔	ç	ʝ	x	ɣ	χ	ʁ	ħ	ʕ	h	ɦ
Approximant		β̞		ʋ				ð̞		ɹ		ɹ̠		ɻ		j		ɰ						˷
Tap/flap		ⱱ̟		ⱱ					ɾ̥	ɾ			ɽ̊	ɽ						ɢ̆		ʡ̆		
Trill	ʙ̥	ʙ							r̥	r		r̠	ɽ̊r̥	ɽr					ʀ̥	ʀ	ʜ	ʢ		
Lateral affricate									tɬ	dɮ			tꞎ	d𝼅	c𝼆	ɟʎ̝	k𝼄	ɡʟ̝						
Lateral fricative							ɬ̪		ɬ	ɮ			ꞎ	𝼅	𝼆	ʎ̝	𝼄	ʟ̝						
Lateral approximant								l̪	l̥	l		l̠	ɭ̊	ɭ	ʎ̥	ʎ	ʟ̥	ʟ		ʟ̠				
Lateral tap/flap									ɺ̥	ɺ			𝼈̊	𝼈		ʎ̆		ʟ̆						

		BL	LD	D	A	PA	RF	P	V	U
Implosive	Voiced	ɓ			ɗ		ᶑ	ʄ	ɠ	ʛ
Implosive	Voiceless	ɓ̥			ɗ̥		ᶑ̊	ʄ̊	ɠ̊	ʛ̥
Ejective	Stop	pʼ			tʼ		ʈʼ	cʼ	kʼ	qʼ
Ejective	Affricate		p̪fʼ	t̪θʼ	tsʼ	t̠ʃʼ	tʂʼ	tɕʼ	kxʼ	qχʼ
Ejective	Fricative	ɸʼ	fʼ	θʼ	sʼ	ʃʼ	ʂʼ	ɕʼ	xʼ	χʼ
Ejective	Lateral affricate				tɬʼ			c𝼆ʼ	k𝼄ʼ	q𝼄ʼ
Ejective	Lateral fricative				ɬʼ					
Click (top: velar; bottom: uvular)	Tenuis	kʘ qʘ		kǀ qǀ	kǃ qǃ		k𝼊 q𝼊	kǂ qǂ		
Click (top: velar; bottom: uvular)	Voiced	ɡʘ ɢʘ		ɡǀ ɢǀ	ɡǃ ɢǃ		ɡ𝼊 ɢ𝼊	ɡǂ ɢǂ		
Click (top: velar; bottom: uvular)	Nasal	ŋʘ ɴʘ		ŋǀ ɴǀ	ŋǃ ɴǃ		ŋ𝼊 ɴ𝼊	ŋǂ ɴǂ	ʞ	
Click (top: velar; bottom: uvular)	Tenuis lateral				kǁ qǁ					
Click (top: velar; bottom: uvular)	Voiced lateral				ɡǁ ɢǁ					
Click (top: velar; bottom: uvular)	Nasal lateral				ŋǁ ɴǁ					
