= Qareh Gowzlu =

Qareh Gowzlu (Persian: قره گوزلو) may refer to:

- Qareh Gowzlu, East Azerbaijan
- Qareh Gowzlu, Fars
- Qareh Gowzlu, Zanjan
- Qareh Gowzlu, West Azerbaijan
