= Kord Kandi, Chaharborj =

Village in West Azerbaijan province, Iran

Kord Kandi Persian: كردكندي
- Village
- Location within Iran
- Coordinates: 37°04′49″N 45°56′40″E
- Country: Iran
- Province: West Azerbaijan
- County: Chaharborj
- District: Firuzabad
- Rural District: Marhemetabad-e Miyani

Population (2016)
  - Total: 318
- Time zone: UTC+3:30 (IRST)

Kord Kandi (Persian: كردكندي) (Note: Also romanized as Kord Kandī) is a village in Marhemetabad-e Miyani Rural District of Firuzabad District in Chaharborj County, West Azerbaijan province, Iran.

== Demographics ==
=== Population ===
At the time of the 2006 National Census, the village's population was 333 in 69 households, when it was in Marhemetabad District (Note: Renamed the Central District of Chaharborj County) of Miandoab County. The following census in 2011 counted 321 people in 77 households. The 2016 census measured the population of the village as 318 people in 88 households.

In 2021, the district was separated from the county in the establishment of Chaharborj County and renamed the Central District. The rural district was transferred to the new Firuzabad District.
