= Marhemetabad =

Marhemetabad (Persian: مرحمت‌آباد) may refer to:

- Marhemetabad District
- Marhemetabad-e Jonubi Rural District
- Marhemetabad-e Miyani Rural District
- Marhemetabad-e Shomali Rural District
