= Ebrahim Hesari =

Village in West Azerbaijan province, Iran

Ebrahim Hesari Persian: ابراهیم‌حصاری
- Village
- Location within Iran
- Coordinates: 37°08′16″N 45°57′03″E
- Country: Iran
- Province: West Azerbaijan
- County: Chaharborj
- District: Central
- Rural District: Qepchaq

Population (2016)
  - Total: 618
- Time zone: UTC+3:30 (IRST)

Ebrahim Hesari (Persian: ابراهیم‌حصاری) (Note: Also romanized as Ebrāhīm Ḩeşārī) is a village in Qepchaq Rural District of the Central District (Note: Formerly Marhemetabad District of Miandoab County) in Chaharborj County, West Azerbaijan province, Iran.

== Demographics ==
=== Population ===
At the time of the 2006 National Census, the village's population was 509 in 138 households, when it was in Marhemetabad-e Shomali Rural District of Marhemetabad District (Note: Renamed the Central District of Chaharborj County) in Miandoab County. The following census in 2011 counted 620 people in 175 households. The 2016 census measured the population of the village as 618 people in 174 households.

In 2021, the district was separated from the county in the establishment of Chaharborj County and renamed the Central District. Ebrahim Hesari was transferred to Qepchaq Rural District created in the same district.
