= Mansurabad, Chaharborj =

Village in West Azerbaijan province, Iran

Mansurabad Persian: منصوراباد
- Village
- Location within Iran
- Coordinates: 37°09′25″N 45°56′56″E
- Country: Iran
- Province: West Azerbaijan
- County: Chaharborj
- District: Central
- Rural District: Qepchaq

Population (2016)
  - Total: 758
- Time zone: UTC+3:30 (IRST)

Mansurabad (Persian: منصوراباد) (Note: Also romanized as Manşūrābād) is a village in Qepchaq Rural District of the Central District (Note: Formerly Marhemetabad District of Miandoab County) in Chaharborj County, West Azerbaijan province, Iran.

== Demographics ==
=== Population ===
At the time of the 2006 National Census, the village's population was 774 in 204 households, when it was in Marhemetabad-e Shomali Rural District of Marhemetabad District (Note: Renamed the Central District of Chaharborj County) in Miandoab County. The following census in 2011 counted 820 people in 215 households. The 2016 census measured the population of the village as 758 people in 216 households.

In 2021, the district was separated from the county in the establishment of Chaharborj County and renamed the Central District. Mansurabad was transferred to Qepchaq Rural District created in the same district.
