= Aghdash, Chaharborj =

Village in West Azerbaijan province, Iran

Aghdash Persian: اغداش
- Village
- Location within Iran
- Coordinates: 37°09′03″N 45°55′19″E
- Country: Iran
- Province: West Azerbaijan
- County: Chaharborj
- District: Central
- Rural District: Qepchaq

Population (2016)
  - Total: 807
- Time zone: UTC+3:30 (IRST)

Aghdash (Persian: اغداش) (Note: Also romanized as Āghdāsh; also known as Āqdāsh) is a village in Qepchaq Rural District of the Central District (Note: Formerly Marhemetabad District of Miandoab County) in Chaharborj County, West Azerbaijan province, Iran.

== Demographics ==
=== Population ===
At the time of the 2006 National Census, the village's population was 952 in 282 households, when it was in Marhemetabad-e Shomali Rural District of Marhemetabad District (Note: Renamed the Central District of Chaharborj County) in Miandoab County. The following census in 2011 counted 1,039 people in 293 households. The 2016 census measured the population of the village as 807 people in 262 households.

In 2021, the district was separated from the county in the establishment of Chaharborj County and renamed the Central District. Aghdash was transferred to Qepchaq Rural District created in the same district.
