= Fesenduz =

Village in West Azerbaijan province, Iran

Fesenduz Persian: فسندوز
- Village
- Location within Iran
- Coordinates: 37°06′31″N 45°51′57″E
- Country: Iran
- Province: West Azerbaijan
- County: Chaharborj
- District: Firuzabad
- Rural District: Fesenduz

Population (2016)
  - Total: 2,461
- Time zone: UTC+3:30 (IRST)

Fesenduz (Persian: فسندوز) (Note: Also romanized as Fesandooz, Fesandūz, Fesendūz, and Fesondūz; also known as Pīr Sodūz and Sulduz) is a village in, and the capital of, Fesenduz Rural District in Firuzabad District of Chaharborj County, West Azerbaijan province, Iran.

== Demographics ==
=== Population ===
At the time of the 2006 National Census, the village's population was 2,681 in 617 households, when it was in Marhemetabad-e Miyani Rural District of Marhemetabad District (Note: Renamed the Central District of Chaharborj County) in Miandoab County. The following census in 2011 counted 2,546 people in 684 households. The 2016 census measured the population of the village as 2,461 people in 726 households. It was the most populous village in its rural district.

In 2021, the district was separated from the county in the establishment of Chaharborj County and renamed the Central District. The rural district was transferred to the new Firuzabad District, and Fesenduz was transferred to Fesenduz Rural District created in the district.
