= Eslamabad, Chaharborj =

Village in West Azerbaijan province, Iran

Eslamabad Persian: اسلام اباد
- Village
- Location within Iran
- Coordinates: 37°05′23″N 45°56′09″E
- Country: Iran
- Province: West Azerbaijan
- County: Chaharborj
- District: Firuzabad
- Rural District: Marhemetabad-e Miyani

Population (2016)
  - Total: 783
- Time zone: UTC+3:30 (IRST)

Eslamabad (Persian: اسلام اباد) (Note: Also romanized as Eslāmābād; formerly known as Shāhābād; also known as Shaikhābād) is a village in Marhemetabad-e Miyani Rural District of Firuzabad District in Chaharborj County, West Azerbaijan province, Iran.

== Demographics ==
=== Population ===
At the time of the 2006 National Census, the village's population was 851 in 191 households, when it was in Marhemetabad District (Note: Renamed the Central District of Chaharborj County) of Miandoab County. The following census in 2011 counted 877 people in 241 households. The 2016 census measured the population of the village as 783 people in 247 households.

In 2021, the district was separated from the county in the establishment of Chaharborj County and renamed the Central District. The rural district was transferred to the new Firuzabad District.
