= Qareh Qowzlu =

Village in West Azerbaijan province, Iran

Qareh Qowzlu Persian: قره قوزلو
- Village
- Location within Iran
- Coordinates: 37°05′43″N 45°53′06″E
- Country: Iran
- Province: West Azerbaijan
- County: Chaharborj
- District: Firuzabad
- Rural District: Fesenduz

Population (2016)
  - Total: 707
- Time zone: UTC+3:30 (IRST)

Qareh Qowzlu (Persian: قره قوزلو) (Note: Also romanized as Qareh Qowzlū; also known as Qareh Gowzlū) is a village in Fesenduz Rural District of Firuzabad District in Chaharborj County, West Azerbaijan province, Iran.

== Demographics ==
=== Population ===
At the time of the 2006 National Census, the village's population was 702 in 177 households, when it was in Marhemetabad-e Miyani Rural District of Marhemetabad District (Note: Renamed the Central District of Chaharborj County) in Miandoab County. The following census in 2011 counted 683 people in 208 households. The 2016 census measured the population of the village as 707 people in 221 households.

In 2021, the district was separated from the county in the establishment of Chaharborj County and renamed the Central District. The rural district was transferred to the new Firuzabad District, and Qareh Qowzlu was transferred to Fesenduz Rural District created in the district.
