= Firuzabad, West Azerbaijan =

Village in West Azerbaijan province, Iran

Firuzabad Persian: فيروزاباد
- Village
- Location within Iran
- Coordinates: 37°04′53″N 45°57′38″E
- Country: Iran
- Province: West Azerbaijan
- County: Chaharborj
- District: Firuzabad
- Rural District: Marhemetabad-e Miyani

Population (2016)
  - Total: 1,704
- Time zone: UTC+3:30 (IRST)

Firuzabad (Persian: فيروزاباد) (Note: Also romanized as Fīrūzābād) is a village in Marhemetabad-e Miyani Rural District of Firuzabad District in Chaharborj County, West Azerbaijan province, Iran, serving as capital of both the district and the rural district.

== Demographics ==
=== Population ===
At the time of the 2006 National Census, the village's population was 1,539 in 331 households, when it was in Marhemetabad District (Note: Renamed the Central District of Chaharborj County) of Miandoab County. The following census in 2011 counted 1,741 people in 440 households. The 2016 census measured the population of the village as 1,704 people in 508 households.

In 2021, the district was separated from the county in the establishment of Chaharborj County and renamed the Central District. The rural district was transferred to the new Firuzabad District.
