= Shabanlu, West Azerbaijan =

Village in West Azerbaijan province, Iran

Shabanlu Persian: شعبانلو
- Village
- Location within Iran
- Coordinates: 37°07′34″N 46°00′15″E
- Country: Iran
- Province: West Azerbaijan
- County: Chaharborj
- District: Central
- Rural District: Marhemetabad-e Shomali

Population (2016)
  - Total: 2,064
- Time zone: UTC+3:30 (IRST)

Shabanlu (Persian: شعبانلو) (Note: Also romanized as Sha‘bānlū) is a village in, and the capital of, Marhemetabad-e Shomali Rural District in the Central District (Note: Formerly Marhemetabad District of Miandoab County) of Chaharborj County, West Azerbaijan province, Iran. The previous capital of the rural district was the village of Chahar Borj-e Qadim, now the city of Chahar Borj.

== Demographics ==
=== Population ===
At the time of the 2006 National Census, the village's population was 1,473 in 338 households, when it was in Marhemetabad District (Note: Renamed the Central District of Chaharborj County) of Miandoab County. The following census in 2011 counted 2,000 people in 552 households. The 2016 census measured the population of the village as 2,064 people in 614 households.

In 2021, the district was separated from the county in the establishment of Chaharborj County and renamed the Central District.
