= Qepchaq, West Azerbaijan =

Village in West Azerbaijan province, Iran

Qepchaq Persian: قپچاق
- Village
- Location within Iran
- Coordinates: 37°08′50″N 45°59′08″E
- Country: Iran
- Province: West Azerbaijan
- County: Chaharborj
- District: Central
- Rural District: Qepchaq

Population (2016)
  - Total: 3,669
- Time zone: UTC+3:30 (IRST)

Qepchaq (Persian: قپچاق) (Note: Also romanized as Qepchāq; also known as Qebjān) is a village in, and the capital of, Qepchaq Rural District in the Central District (Note: Formerly Marhemetabad District of Miandoab County) of Chaharborj County, West Azerbaijan province, Iran.

== Demographics ==
=== Population ===
At the time of the 2006 National Census, the village's population was 3,183 in 803 households, when it was in Marhemetabad-e Shomali Rural District of Marhemetabad District (Note: Renamed the Central District of Chaharborj County) in Miandoab County. The following census in 2011 counted 3,562 people in 963 households. The 2016 census measured the population of the village as 3,669 people in 1,098 households. It was the most populous village in its rural district.

In 2021, the district was separated from the county in the establishment of Chaharborj County and renamed the Central District. Qepchaq was transferred to Qepchaq Rural District created in the same district.
