= Guttural R =

Type of rhotic consonant ("r sound")

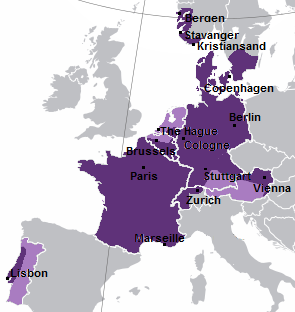
The language areas in Europe where some kind of guttural R may be heard by some local natives. Guttural R is not necessarily predominant in all of these areas.

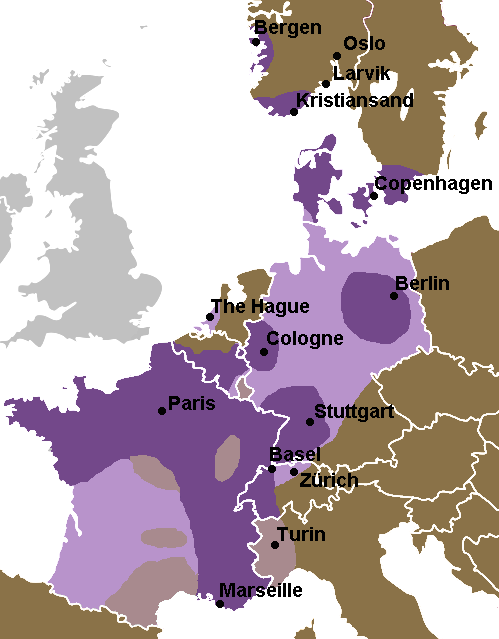
Distribution of guttural R (e.g. [ʁ ʀ χ]) in northwestern Europe in the mid-20th century. not usual only in some educated speech usual in educated speech general

Guttural R is the phenomenon whereby a rhotic consonant (an "R-like" sound) is produced in the back of the vocal tract (usually with the uvula) rather than in the front portion thereof and thus as a guttural consonant. Speakers of languages with guttural R typically regard guttural and coronal rhotics (throat-back-R and tongue-tip-R) to be alternative pronunciations of the same phoneme (conceptual sound), despite articulatory differences. Similar consonants are found in other parts of the world, but they often have little to no cultural association or interchangeability with coronal rhotics (such as [r], [ɾ], and [ɹ]) and are (perhaps) not rhotics at all.

The guttural realization of a lone rhotic consonant is typical in most of what is now France, French-speaking Belgium, most of Germany, Denmark, the southern parts of Sweden and southwestern parts of Norway. It is also frequent in Flanders and the Netherlands, eastern Austria, Yiddish (and thence Ashkenazi Hebrew), Luxembourgish, and among all French and some German speakers in Switzerland.

Outside of central Europe, it also occurs as the normal pronunciation of one of two rhotic phonemes (usually replacing an older alveolar trill) in standard European Portuguese and in other parts of Portugal, particularly the Azores, various parts of Brazil, among minorities of other Portuguese-speaking regions, and in parts of Puerto Rico, Cuba and the Dominican Republic.

== Germanic languages ==
The uvular rhotic is most common in Central German dialects and in Standard German. Many Low Franconian, Low Saxon, and Upper German varieties have also adopted it with others maintaining the alveolar trill ([r]). The development of uvular rhotics in these regions is not entirely understood, but a common theory is that these languages have done so because of French influence, though the reason for uvular rhotics in modern European French itself is not well understood (see above). The Frisian languages usually retain an alveolar rhotic.

=== Danish ===
The rhotic used in Denmark is a voiced uvular approximant [ʁ̞], being predominant to all varieties. The use of this guttural r possibly influenced over neighbouring Swedish and Norwegian languages.

=== Dutch and Afrikaans ===
Afrikaans in Afrikaans.

In modern Dutch, quite a few different rhotic sounds are used. In Flanders, the usual rhotic is an alveolar trill, but the uvular rhotic /ʁ/ does occur, mostly in the province of Limburg, in Ghent and in Brussels. In the Netherlands, the uvular rhotic is the dominant rhotic in the southern provinces of North Brabant and Limburg, having become so in the early twentieth century. In the rest of the country, the situation is more complicated. The uvular rhotic is dominant in the western agglomeration Randstad, including cities like Rotterdam, The Hague and Utrecht (the dialect of Amsterdam conversely tends to use an alveolar rhotic, but the uvular is becoming increasingly common). The uvular rhotic is also used in some major cities such as Leeuwarden (Stadsfries). Outside of these uvular rhotic core areas, the alveolar trill is common.

The Afrikaans language of South Africa also uses an alveolar trill for its rhotic, except in the rural regions around Cape Town, chiefly in the town of Malmesbury, Western Cape, where it is uvular (called a bry). Some Afrikaans speakers from other areas also bry, either as a result of ancestry from the Malmesbury region or from difficulty pronouncing the alveolar trill.

=== English ===
Speakers of the traditional English dialect of Northumberland and northern County Durham use a uvular rhotic, known as the "Northumbrian Burr". However, it is no longer used by most contemporary speakers, who generally realize /r/ as an alveolar approximant, [ɹʷ], in common with other varieties spoken in the English-speaking world.

The Hiberno-English of northeastern Leinster in Ireland sometimes uses a uvular [ʁ], however it is uncommon.

=== Icelandic ===
In Icelandic, the uvular rhotic-like [ʀ] or [ʁ] is an uncommon deviation from the normal alveolar trill or flap, and is considered a speech disorder.

=== Low Saxon ===
In the Dutch Low Saxon area there are several cities which have the uvular rhotic: Zutphen, Steenwijk, Kampen, Zwolle and Deventer. In IJsselmuiden near Kampen the uvular r can also be heard. In the countryside the alveolar trill is common.

=== Norwegian ===
Most of Norway uses an alveolar flap, but about one third of the inhabitants of Norway, primarily in the South-West region, are now using the uvular rhotic. In the western and southern part of South Norway, the uvular rhotic is still spreading and includes all towns and coastal areas of Agder, most of Rogaland, large parts of Hordaland, and Sogn og Fjordane in and around Florø. The origin was the city of Bergen as well as Kristiansand in the 18th century. Because retroflex consonants are mutations of [ɾ] and other alveolar or dental consonants, the use of a uvular rhotic means an absence of most retroflex consonants.

=== Standard German ===
Puerto Rico /ˈpu̯ɛʁto ˈʁiːko/ from Berlin.

Although the first standardized pronunciation dictionary by Theodor Siebs prescribed an alveolar pronunciation, most varieties of German are now spoken with a uvular rhotic, usually a fricative or approximant [ʁ], rather than a trill [ʀ]. The alveolar pronunciation [r ~ ɾ] continues to be considered acceptable in all Standard German varieties, but is most common in the south as well as the far North of German-speaking Europe. It also remains prevalent in classical singing and, to a lesser degree, in stage acting (see Bühnendeutsch).

In German dialects, the alveolar has survived somewhat more widely than in the standard language, though there are several regions, especially in Central German, where even the broadest rural dialects use a uvular R.

Regardless of whether a uvular or an alveolar pronunciation is used, German post-vocalic "r" is often vocalized to [ɐ̯], [ə̯], or a simple lengthening [ː]. This is most common in the syllable coda, as in non-rhotic English, but sometimes occurs before an underlying schwa, too. Vocalization of "r" is rare only in Alemannic and Swabian German.

=== Swedish ===
The nearby Swedish ex-Danish regions of Scania, Blekinge, southern Halland as well as a large part of Småland and on the Öland island, use a uvular trill or a uvular fricative. To some extent in Östergötland and still quite commonly in Västergötland, a mixture of guttural and rolling rhotic consonants (e.g. /ʁ/ and /r/) is used, with the pronunciation depending on the position in the word, the stress of the syllable and in some varieties depending on whether the consonant is geminated. The pronunciation remains if a word that is pronounced with a particular rhotic consonant is put into a compound word in a position where that realization would not otherwise occur if it were part of the same stem as the preceding sound. However, in Östergötland the pronunciation tends to gravitate more towards [w] and in Västergötland the realization is commonly voiced. Common from the time of Gustav III (Swedish king 1771–1792), who was much inspired by French culture and language, was the use of guttural R in the nobility and in the upper classes of Stockholm. This phenomenon vanished in the 1900s. The last well-known non-Southerner who spoke with a guttural R, and did not have a speech defect, was Anders Gernandt, a popular equitation commentator on TV.

=== Yiddish ===
Yiddish, the traditional language of Ashkenazi Jews in central and eastern Europe, is derived from Middle High German. As such it presumably used the alveolar R at first, but the uvular R then became predominant in many Yiddish dialects. It is unclear whether this happened through independent developments or under influence from modern German (a language widely spoken in large parts of eastern Europe until 1945).

== Romance languages ==
=== Catalan ===
Most of Catalan dialects pronounce r like in Spanish, distinguishing between strong [r] and soft r [ɾ]. However, in Roussillon, the Uvular [ʁ] is widespread among its speakers, due to influence from neighbouring French.

=== French ===
procrastinateur from Seine-et-Marne.

The letter R in French was historically pronounced as a trill, as was the case in Latin and as is still the case in Italian and Spanish. In Northern France, including Paris, the alveolar trill was gradually replaced with the uvular trill from the end of the 17th century. Molière's Le Bourgeois gentilhomme, published in 1670, has a professor describe the sound of /r/ as an alveolar trill (Act II, Scene IV). It has since evolved, in Paris, to a voiced uvular fricative or approximant [ʁ].

The alveolar trill was still the common sound of /r/ in Southern France and in Quebec at the beginning of the 20th century, having been gradually replaced since then, due to Parisian influence, by the uvular pronunciation. The alveolar trill is now mostly associated, even in Southern France and in Quebec, with older speakers and rural settings. The alveolar trill is still used in French singing in classical choral and opera. It is also used in other French speaking countries as well as on French oversea territories such as French Polynesia due to the influence of the indigenous languages which use the trill.

=== Italian ===
Guttural realization of /r/ is mostly considered a speech defect in Italian (cf. rotacismo), but the so-called r moscia ('limp' or 'lifeless r', an umbrella term for realizations of /r/ considered defective), which is sometimes uvular, is quite common in areas of Northwest Italy, i.e. Aosta Valley, Piedmont, Liguria, Lombardy and Emilia-Romagna.

=== Occitan ===
Originally, most of Occitan varieties pronounced r like in Catalan and Spanish, distinguishing between strong [r] and soft r [ɾ], still pronounced so in Aran Valley, Spain. Nowadays, due to French influence, the uvular trill [ʀ] and the voiced uvular fricative or approximant [ʁ] are common in several Occitan dialects (Languedoc, Provence, Auvergne, Alps, Limousin and Gascony).

=== Portuguese ===
==== In Portugal ====
Standard varieties of Portuguese have two rhotic phonemes, which contrast only between vowels. In older Portuguese, these were the alveolar flap /ɾ/ (written ⟨r⟩) and the alveolar trill /r/ (written ⟨rr⟩). In other positions, only ⟨r⟩ is written in Modern Portuguese, but it can stand for either sound, depending on the exact position. The distribution of these sounds is mostly the same as in other Iberian languages, i.e.:

- ⟨r⟩ represents a trill when written ⟨rr⟩ between vowels; at the beginning of a word; or following /l/, /s/, /ʒ/, or ⟨n⟩. Examples: carro, rua, Israel, honrar. Note that ⟨n⟩ does not represent /n/, but a nasalized vowel.
- ⟨r⟩ represents a flap elsewhere, i.e. following a vowel or following any consonant other than /l/, /s/, or /ʃ/. Examples: caro, quatro, quarto, mar.

In the 19th century, the uvular trill [ʀ] penetrated the upper classes in the region of Lisbon in Portugal as the realization of the alveolar trill. By the 20th century, it had replaced the alveolar trill in most of the country's urban areas and started to give way to the voiced uvular fricative [ʁ]. Many northern dialects, like Transmontano, Portuese (which is heard in parts of Aveiro), Minhoto, and much of Beirão retain the alveolar trill. In the rural regions, the alveolar trill is still present, but because most of the country's population currently lives in or near the cities and owing to the mass media, the guttural [ʀ] is now dominant in Portugal.

A common realization of the word-initial /ʀ/ in the Lisbon accent is a voiced uvular fricative trill [ʀ̝].

The dialect of the fishermen of Setúbal used the voiced uvular fricative [ʁ] for all instances of "r" – word start, intervocalic, postconsonantal and syllable ending. This same pronunciation is attested in people with rhotacism, in a new developing variety of young people in São Tomean Portuguese, and in non-native speakers of French or German origin.

==== In Brazil ====
Um carro in Brazilian Portuguese.

In Brazil, the most common pronunciation of ⟨rr⟩ is voiceless, either as a voiceless velar fricative [x], voiceless uvular fricative [χ] or a voiceless glottal fricative [h]. In many dialects, this voiceless sound not only replaces all occurrences of the traditional trill, but is also used for all ⟨r⟩ that is not followed by a vowel (i.e. when at the end of a syllable, which uses a flap in other dialects). The resulting distribution can be described as:

- A flap [ɾ] (soft r) only for single ⟨r⟩ and only when it occurs either between vowels or between a preceding consonant (other than /n, l, s, ʃ/) and a following vowel. Examples: caro, quatro.
- A voiceless fricative [χ~h] (hard r) everywhere else: when written ⟨rr⟩; at the beginning of a word and after /n, l, s, ʃ/. Examples: carro, rua, honrar, Israel.
- When ⟨r⟩ displays before a consonant, it might be pronounced either hard [x~χ~ħ~h] or soft [ɾ], depending on each local accent. Example, quarto.
- When ⟨r⟩ displays at the end of words, it might be pronounced either hard [x~χ~ħ~h], soft [ɾ], or omitted, depending on each local accent. Example, mar.

Many speakers in the state of São Paulo and in the caipira dialect area, an alveolar approximant [ɹ] in the same position is used before a consonant or at the end of words, on words like quarto or mar.

==== In Africa and Asia ====
In Africa and Asia, the classical alveolar trill [r] is mostly still dominant, due to separate development from European Portuguese. However, the guttural pronunciations [ʀ], [ʁ] and [χ] might also be heard among urban speakers and considered educated, due to influence from Portugal.

In São Tomean Portuguese, some speakers are starting to use the voiced uvular fricative [ʁ] for all instances of "r" – word start, intervocalic, postconsonantal and syllable ending.

=== Spanish ===
In most Spanish-speaking territories and regions, guttural or uvular realizations of /r/ are considered a speech defect. Generally the single flap [ɾ], spelled r as in cara, undergoes no defective pronunciations, but the alveolar trill in rata or perro is one of the last sounds learned by children and uvularization is likely among individuals who fail to achieve the alveolar articulation. This said, back variants for /r/ ([ʀ], [x] or [χ]) are widespread in rural Puerto Rican Spanish and in the dialect of Ponce, whereas they are heavily stigmatized in the dialect of the capital. To a lesser extent, velar variants of /r/ are found in some rural Cuban (Yateras, Guantánamo Province) and Dominican vernaculars (Cibao, eastern rural regions of the country) In the 1937 Parsley Massacre, Dominican troops attacked Haitians in Cibao and the northwestern border. The popular name of the massacre comes from the shibboleth applied to distinguish Dominicans from Haitians: the suspects were ordered to name some parsley (Spanish: perejil). If they used a French or Haitian Creole pronunciation for r or j, they would be executed.

In the Basque-speaking areas of Spain, the uvular articulation [ʁ] has a higher prevalence among bilinguals than among Spanish monolinguals.

== Semitic languages ==
Only predominant in Modern Hebrew due to Ashkenazic influence.

=== Akkadian ===
The majority of Assyriologists deem an alveolar trill or flap the most likely pronunciation of Akkadian /r/ in most dialects. However, there are several indications toward a velar or uvular fricative [ɣ]~[ʁ] particularly supported by John Huehnergard. The main arguments constitute alternations with the voiceless uvular fricative /χ/ (e.g. ruššû/ḫuššû "red"; barmātu "multicolored" (fem. pl.), the spelling ba-aḫ-ma-a-tù is attested). Besides /r/ shows certain phonological parallelisms with /χ/ and other gutturals (especially the glottal stop [ʔ]).

=== Amharic ===
In Amharic the alveolar trill [r] is the usual pronunciation of /r/. But there are also assertions that around Addis Abeba some dialects exhibit a uvular r. Note that this information is not very well supported among Semitists. Also in Gafat (extinct since the 1950s) a uvular fricative or trill might have existed.

=== Arabic ===
While most varieties of Arabic retain the classical pronunciation of rāʾ (ر) as an alveolar trill [r] or flap [ɾ], a few varieties use a uvular trill [ʀ]. These include:

- pre-modern Baghdadi Arabic
- The Tigris varieties, a group among the Mesopotamian Arabic in Iraq, for instance in Mosul
- The Jewish and Christian varieties in Baghdad
- The Jewish variety in Algiers
- The variety of Jijel in Algeria
- Some Muslim-urban varieties of Morocco (e.g. in Fes)
- Some Jewish varieties in Morocco

The uvular /r/ was attested already in vernacular Arabic of the Abbasid period. Nowadays Christian Arabic of Baghdad exhibits also an alveolar trill in very few lexemes, but primarily used in loanwords from Modern Standard Arabic. Native words with an alveolar trill are rare. Moreover, Mosul Arabic commonly has the voiced alveolar trill instead of a uvular fricative in numbers (e.g. /arbaʕiːn/ "forty"). Although this guttural rhotic is rare in Arabic, uvular and velar sounds are common in this language. The uvular or velar fricative [ʁ]~[ɣ] is a common standard pronunciation of the letter ġayn (غ), and the uvular plosive [q] is a standard pronunciation of the letter qāf (ق).

=== Hebrew ===
In most forms of Hebrew, the classical pronunciation of rêš (ר) was a flapped [ɾ], and was grammatically treated as an ungeminable phoneme of the language. In most dialects of Hebrew among the Jewish diaspora, it remained a flap [ɾ] or a trill [r]. However, in some Ashkenazi dialects as preserved among Jews in northern Europe it was a uvular rhotic, either a trill [ʀ] or a fricative [ʁ]. This was because many (but not all) native dialects of Yiddish were spoken that way, and their liturgical Hebrew carried the same pronunciation.

An apparently unrelated uvular rhotic is believed to have appeared in the Tiberian vocalization of Hebrew, where it is believed to have coexisted with additional non-guttural, emphatic articulations of /r/ depending on circumstances.

==== Sephardic Hebrew ====
Many Jewish immigrants to Israel were Mizrahi Jews who spoke a variety of Arabic in their countries of origin and pronounced the Hebrew rhotic as an alveolar flap [ɾ], similar to Arabic rāʾ (ر). Gradually, many of them began pronouncing their Hebrew rhotic as a voiced uvular fricative [ʁ], a sound similar or (depending on the Arabic dialect) identical to Arabic ġayn (غ).

==== Yiddish influence ====
Although an Ashkenazi Jew in the Russian Empire, Eliezer Ben-Yehuda based his Standard Hebrew on Sephardi Hebrew, originally spoken in Spain, and therefore recommended an alveolar [r]. However, just like him, the first waves of Jews to resettle in the Holy Land were Ashkenazi, and Standard Hebrew would come to be spoken with certain elements of their native pronunciation. Consequently, by now nearly all Israeli Jews pronounce the consonant rêš (ר) as a uvular approximant [ʁ̞], which also exists in Yiddish.

== Other languages and families ==
=== Basque ===
Standard Basque uses a trill for /r/ (written as r-, -rr-, -r), but most speakers of the Lapurdian and Low Navarrese dialects use a voiced uvular fricative as in French. In the Southern Basque Country, the uvular articulation is seen as a speech defect, but the prevalence is higher among bilinguals than among Spanish monolinguals. Recently, speakers of Lapurdian and Low Navarrese are uvularizing the tap (-r-) as well, thus neutralizing both rhotics.

=== Breton ===
Breizh.

Breton, spoken in Brittany (France), is a Celtic rather than Romance language, but is heavily influenced by French. It retains an alveolar trill in some dialects, like in Léon and Morbihan, but most dialects now have the same rhotic as French, [ʁ].

=== Hill-Maṛia ===
Hill-Maṛia (sometimes considered a dialect of Gondi) has a /ʁ/ corresponding to /r/ in other related languages or *t̠ from proto Dravidian.

=== Inuit languages ===
The Inuit languages Greenlandic and Inuktitut either orthographize or transliterate their voiced uvular obstruent as ⟨r⟩. In Greenlandic, this phoneme is [ʁ], while in Inuktitut it is [ɢ]. This spelling was convenient because these languages do not have non-lateral liquid consonants, and guttural realizations of ⟨r⟩ are common in various languages, particularly the colonial languages Danish and French. But the Alaskan Inupiat language writes its [ʁ] phoneme instead as ⟨ġ⟩, reserving ⟨r⟩ for its retroflex [ʐ] phoneme, which Greenlandic and Inuktitut do not have.

=== Japreria language ===
Spoken in Venezuela, ŕ is pronouned as a uvular [ʁ].

=== Khmer ===
Whereas standard Khmer uses an alveolar trill for /r/, the colloquial Phnom Penh dialect uses a uvular pronunciation for the phoneme, which may be elided and leave behind a residual tonal or register contrast.

=== Malay ===
Guttural R exists among several Malay dialects. While standard Malay commonly uses coronal r (ɹ,r,ɾ), the guttural fricative (ɣ~ʁ) are more prominently used in many dialects in Malay Peninsula as well as some parts of Sumatra and Borneo. These dialects include:

- Pahang Malay
- Kedah Malay
- Kelantan-Pattani Malay
- Negeri Sembilan Malay
- Sarawak Malay
- Terengganu Malay
- Perak Malay
- Tamiang Malay
- Pontianak Malay
- Palembang Malay

~ Perak Malay and Kedah Malay are the most notable examples.

These dialects mainly use the guttural fricative (ɣ~ʁ) for both /r/ and /gh/. Standard Malay includes both coronal r (ɹ,r,ɾ) and voiced guttural fricative /gh/ (ɣ~ʁ) as two different phonemes. To denote the guttural r in the dialects, the letter "r" is often replaced by "gh" or "q" in informal writing. Standard Malay words with voiced velar fricative (ɣ), such as loghat (dialect) and ghaib (invisible, mystical) are mostly Arabic loanwords spelled in their origin language with the letter غ in the Jawi alphabet.

Other Austronesian languages with similar features are:

- Acehnese
- Alas-Kluet
- Bulungan
- Cham
- Hiw
- Lampung
- Minangkabau (closely related to Malay)
- Piuma
- Sapediq
- Rinaxekerek
- Sinvaudjan

=== Tŝilhqotʼin ===
In Tŝilhqotʼin, the uvulars /ʁ/ and /ʁʷ/ are transcribed like ⟨r⟩ and ⟨rw⟩ respectively.

=== Tundra Nenets ===
Within some speakers of Tundra Nenets, /r/ may be pronounced as a uvular trill [ʀ] or fricative [ʁ].

=== Romani ===
Some Romani dialects may pronounce ⟨ř⟩ as [ʁ], where other varieties pronounce it like a long trill [rː] or even a retroflex [ɽ ~ ɻ].

=== Slavic languages ===
Krušwica in Upper Sorbian.

In Slavic languages, the alveolar trill predominates, with the use of guttural rhotics seen as defective pronunciation. However, the uvular trill is common among the languages of the Sorbian minority in Saxony, eastern Germany, likely due to German influence. The uvular rhotic may also be found in a small minority in Silesia and other German-influenced regions of Poland and also Slovenia, but is overall quite rare even in these regions. It can also be perceived as an ethnic marker of Jewishness, particularly in Russian where Eastern European Jews often carried the uvular rhotic from their native Yiddish into their pronunciation of Russian.

=== Sotho ===
Sesotho originally used an alveolar trill /r/, which has shifted to uvular /ʀ/ in modern times.

== See also ==
- Ghayn
- R
- Glottal consonant
- Uvular consonant
- Rhotic consonant

== Bibliography ==
- Fougeron, Cecile; Smith, Caroline L (1993), "Illustrations of the IPA:French", Journal of the International Phonetic Association, 23 (2): 73–76, doi:10.1017/S0025100300004874, S2CID 249404451
- Grønnum, Nina (2005), Fonetik og fonologi, Almen og Dansk (3rd ed.), Copenhagen: Akademisk Forlag, ISBN 87-500-3865-6
- Trudgill, Peter (1974), "Linguistic change and diffusion: Description and explanation in sociolinguistic dialect", Language in Society, 3 (2): 215–246, doi:10.1017/S0047404500004358, S2CID 145148233
