= Khazineh Anbar =

Khazineh Anbar (Persian: خزينه انبار) may refer to:

- Khazineh Anbar-e Jadid
- Khazineh Anbar-e Qadim
