= Sieb =

Sieb is a surname and given name. Notable people with the name include:

== Surname ==
- Armindo Sieb (born 2003), German professional football player
- John L. Sieb (1864–1941), American politician and barber
- Wally Sieb (1899–1974), American professional football player

== Given name ==
- Sieb Dijkstra (born 1966), Dutch football coach and former professional footballer

== See also ==
- Theodor Siebs (1862–1941), German linguist
  - Siebs's law, a Proto-Indo-European (PIE) phonological rule
