= Uzun Owbeh, West Azerbaijan =

Village in West Azerbaijan province, Iran

Uzun Owbeh Persian: اوزون اوبه
- Village
- Location within Iran
- Coordinates: 37°06′24″N 46°00′52″E
- Country: Iran
- Province: West Azerbaijan
- County: Chaharborj
- District: Central
- Rural District: Marhemetabad-e Shomali

Population (2016)
  - Total: 807
- Time zone: UTC+3:30 (IRST)

Uzun Owbeh (Persian: اوزون اوبه) (Note: Also romanized as Ūzūn Owbeh; also known as Ūzon Owbeh) is a village in Marhemetabad-e Shomali Rural District of the Central District (Note: Formerly Marhemetabad District of Miandoab County) in Chaharborj County, West Azerbaijan province, Iran.

== Demographics ==
=== Population ===
At the time of the 2006 National Census, the village's population was 788 in 173 households, when it was in Marhemetabad District (Note: Renamed the Central District of Chaharborj County) of Miandoab County. The following census in 2011 counted 824 people in 226 households. The 2016 census measured the population of the village as 807 people in 242 households.

In 2021, the district was separated from the county in the establishment of Chaharborj County and renamed the Central District.
