= Khazineh Anbar-e Jadid =

Village in West Azerbaijan province, Iran

Khazineh Anbar-e Jadid Persian: خزينه انبارجديد
- Village
- Location within Iran
- Coordinates: 37°07′09″N 46°02′10″E
- Country: Iran
- Province: West Azerbaijan
- County: Chaharborj
- District: Central
- Rural District: Marhemetabad-e Shomali

Population (2016)
  - Total: 930
- Time zone: UTC+3:30 (IRST)

Khazineh Anbar-e Jadid (Persian: خزينه انبارجديد) (Note: Also romanized as Khazīneh Anbār-e Jadīd) is a village in Marhemetabad-e Shomali Rural District of the Central District (Note: Formerly Marhemetabad District of Miandoab County) in Chaharborj County, West Azerbaijan province, Iran.

== Demographics ==
=== Population ===
At the time of the 2006 National Census, the village's population was 915 in 226 households, when it was in Marhemetabad District (Note: Renamed the Central District of Chaharborj County) of Miandoab County. The following census in 2011 counted 963 people in 258 households. The 2016 census measured the population of the village as 930 people in 271 households.

In 2021, the district was separated from the county in the establishment of Chaharborj County and renamed the Central District.
