= Khazineh Anbar-e Qadim =

Village in West Azerbaijan province, Iran

Khazineh Anbar-e Qadim Persian: خزينه انبارقديم
- Village
- Location within Iran
- Coordinates: 37°06′47″N 46°00′37″E
- Country: Iran
- Province: West Azerbaijan
- County: Chaharborj
- District: Central
- Rural District: Marhemetabad-e Shomali

Population (2016)
  - Total: 493
- Time zone: UTC+3:30 (IRST)

Khazineh Anbar-e Qadim (Persian: خزينه انبارقديم) (Note: Also romanized as Khazīneh Anbār-e Qadīm) is a village in Marhemetabad-e Shomali Rural District of the Central District (Note: Formerly Marhemetabad District of Miandoab County) in Chaharborj County, West Azerbaijan province, Iran.

== Demographics ==
=== Population ===
At the time of the 2006 National Census, the village's population was 472 in 91 households, when it was in Marhemetabad District (Note: Renamed the Central District of Chaharborj County) of Miandoab County. The following census in 2011 counted 458 people in 118 households. The 2016 census measured the population of the village as 493 people in 137 households.

In 2021, the district was separated from the county in the establishment of Chaharborj County and renamed the Central District.
