= Standard German phonology =

Standard pronunciation of the German language

Standard German phonology consists of the current phonology and phonetics as well as the historical developments thereof as well as geographical variation and the influence of German dialects.

While the spelling of German is officially standardised by an international organisation (the Council for German Orthography) the pronunciation has no official standard and relies on a de facto standard documented in reference works such as Deutsches Aussprachewörterbuch (German Pronunciation Dictionary) by Eva-Maria Krech et al., Duden 6 Das Aussprachewörterbuch (Duden volume 6, The Pronunciation Dictionary) by Max Mangold and the training materials of radio and television stations such as Westdeutscher Rundfunk, Deutschlandfunk, or Schweizer Radio und Fernsehen. This standardised pronunciation was invented, rather than coming from any particular German-speaking city. But the pronunciation that Germans usually consider to be closest to the standard is that of Hanover. Standard German is sometimes referred to as Bühnendeutsch (stage German), but the latter has its own definition and is slightly different.

== Vowels ==
Monophthongs of standard German, from Dudenredaktion, Kleiner & Knöbl (2015:34)

=== Monophthongs ===
Monophthong phonemes of Standard German
| | Front | | | | Central | | Back | |
| | Unrounded | | Rounded | | Central | | Back | |
| | short | long | short | long | short | long | short | long |
|---|---|---|---|---|---|---|---|---|
| Close | ɪ | iː | ʏ | yː | | | ʊ | uː |
| Close-mid | | eː | | øː | (ə) | | | oː |
| Open-mid | ɛ | (ɛː) | œ | | (ɐ) | | ɔ | |
| Open | | | | | a | aː | | |

Some scholars treat /ə/ as an unstressed allophone of /ɛ/. Likewise, some scholars treat /ɐ/ as an allophone of the sequence /ər/ or as a vocalic realization of syllabic /r̩/. The phonemic status of /ɛː/ is also debated – see below.

==== Notes ====
- Close vowels
  - /iː/ is close front unrounded [iː].
  - /yː/ is close near-front rounded [y̠ː].
  - /uː/ is close back rounded [uː].
  - /ɪ/ has been variously described as near-close front unrounded [ɪ̟] and near-close near-front unrounded [ɪ].
  - /ʏ/ is near-close near-front rounded [ʏ].
  - /ʊ/ is near-close near-back rounded [ʊ].
- Mid vowels
  - /eː/ is close-mid front unrounded [eː].
    - In non-standard accents of the Low German speaking area, as well as in some Bavarian and Austrian accents it may be pronounced as a narrow closing diphthong [eɪ].
  - /øː/ has been variously described as close-mid near-front rounded [ø̠ː] and mid near-front rounded [ø̽ː]. One source shows it as considerably centralized on the vowel chart (the one shown above), closer to [ɵː] than cardinal [øː].
    - In non-standard accents of the Low German speaking area, as well as in some Austrian accents it may be pronounced as a narrow closing diphthong [øʏ].
  - /oː/ is close-mid back rounded [oː].
    - In non-standard accents of the Low German speaking area, as well as in some Austrian accents it may be pronounced as a narrow closing diphthong [oʊ].
  - /ə/ has been variously described as mid central unrounded [ə]. and close-mid central unrounded [ɘ]. It occurs only in unstressed syllables, for instance in besetzen [bəˈzɛtsən] ('occupy'). It is often considered a complementary allophone together with [ɛ], which only rarely or regionally occurs in unstressed syllables (e.g. entsetzt). If a sonorant follows in the syllable coda, the schwa often disappears so that the sonorant becomes syllabic, for instance Kissen [ˈkɪsn̩] ('pillow'), Esel [ˈeːzl̩] ('donkey'). However, Standard German spoken in Luxembourg often lacks syllabic sonorants under the influence of Luxembourgish, so that e.g. setzen ('put') is pronounced [ˈzɛtsən], rather than [ˈzɛtsn̩].
  - /ɛ/ has been variously described as mid near-front unrounded [ɛ̽] and open-mid front unrounded [ɛ].
  - /ɛː/ has been variously described as mid front unrounded [ɛ̝ː] and open-mid front unrounded [ɛː].
  - /œ/ has been variously described as open-mid near-front rounded [œ̠] and somewhat lowered open-mid near-front rounded [œ̠˕].
  - /ɔ/ has been variously described as somewhat fronted open-mid back rounded [ɔ̟] and open-mid back rounded [ɔ].
- Open vowels
  - /ɐ/ is near-open central unrounded [ɐ]. It is a common allophone of the sequence /ər/ common to all German-speaking areas but Switzerland. As schwa /ə/ is never pronounced here, it is also possible to interpret [ɐ] as the vocalic allophone of the syllabic sonorant /r̩/.
  - /a/ has been variously described as open front unrounded [a] and open central unrounded [ä]. Some scholars differentiate two short /a/, namely front /a/ and back /ɑ/. The latter occurs only in unstressed open syllables, exactly as /i, y, u, e, ø, o/.
    - Standard Austrian pronunciation of this vowel is back [ɑ].
    - Front [a] or even [æ] is a common realization of /a/ in northern German varieties influenced by Low German.
  - /aː/ has been variously described as open central unrounded [äː] and open back unrounded [ɑː]. Because of this, it is sometimes transcribed /ɑː/.
    - Back [ɑː] is the Standard Austrian pronunciation. It is also a common realization of /aː/ in northern German varieties influenced by Low German (in which it may even be rounded [ɒː]).
  - Wiese (1996) notes that "there is a tendency to neutralize the distinction between [a(ː)], [aɐ̯], and [ɐ]. That is, Oda, Radar, and Oder have final syllables which are perceptually very similar, and are nearly or completely identical in some dialects." He also says that "outside of a word context, [ɐ] cannot be distinguished from [a]. (As early as 1847, Verdi's librettist found it natural, when adapting a play by Schiller into the Italian language, to render the distinctly German name Roller as Rolla.)
  - According to the 7th edition of Das Aussprachewörterbuch, the standard pronunciation differentiates [ɐ] from unstressed [a] (which typically belongs to /aː/ phoneme, see below). The authors claim that the difference is one of height: [ɐ] vs. [ä]. However, they tend to be neutralized in the Berlin/Brandenburg Metropolitan Region towards an open central [ä]. Conversely, in southern Germany, /ɐ/ is often realized as [ə] (in turn, Standard /ə/ is often closer to [ɛ]). In Franconia and partially also in the coastal regions of Germany, the vowel is closer to [ɛ], whereas in west-central Germany it is slightly more open, that is [æ]. In each case but the first one, [ɐ] is strongly differentiated from [a]. In regions without r-vocalization, the difference is always present.
  - According to a 2020 study, [ɐ] is not distinguished from unstressed [a] in Northern Standard German. Word pairs such as Oper 'opera' (traditionally transcribed [ˈoːpɐ]) and Opa 'grandpa' (traditionally transcribed [ˈoːpa]) are thus homophones (as [ˈoːpɐ]), rather than minimal pairs. The merged vowel has a centralized quality [ɐ]. The authors of the study advocate for ditching the distinction in transcriptions aimed at foreign learners of German. This neutralization may not apply to all dialects with r-vocalization, particularly the southern ones.

Although there is also a length contrast, vowels are often analyzed according to a tenseness contrast, with long /iː, yː, uː, eː, øː, oː/ being the tense vowels and short /ɪ, ʏ, ʊ, ɛ, œ, ɔ/ their lax counterparts. Like the English checked vowels, the German lax vowels require a following consonant, with the notable exception of /ɛː/ (which is absent in many varieties, as discussed below). /a/ is sometimes considered the lax counterpart of tense /aː/ in order to maintain this tense/lax division. Short [i, y, u, e, ø, o] occur in unstressed syllables of loanwords, for instance in Psychometrie [psyçomeˈtʁiː] ('psychometry'). They are usually considered allophones of tense vowels (thus /psyːçoːmeːˈtriː/), which cannot occur in unstressed syllables (unless in compounds). /aː/ is similarly shortened in those positions, with the difference being that it is shortened also in native words, such as aforementioned Opa [ˈoːpa] 'grandpa' (phonemically /ˈoːpaː/).

In dialects with r-vocalization, historical /a(ː)r/ (phonetically typically a long monophthong [äː]) may undergo a shortening akin to /aː/ when unstressed, as in one pronunciation of Radar 'radar' as [ˈʁaːda] (phonemically /ˈraːdaːr/). An analogous process has taken place in Danish, as in the cognate radar [ˈʁɑːtɑ], meaning the same.

Northern German varieties influenced by Low German could be analyzed as lacking contrasting vowel quantity entirely:

- /aː/ has a different quality than /a/ (see above).
- These varieties also consistently lack /ɛː/, and use only /eː/ in its place.

==== Phonemic status of /ɛː/ ====
The existence of a phoneme /ɛː/ in German is disputed. The distinction between the long lax /ɛː/ and the long tense /eː/ does not exist in some varieties of Standard German, and many authors treat the /ɛː/ phoneme as peripheral and regard a distinction between it and /eː/ as a spelling pronunciation. Most commonly, they are merged before an intervocalic /r/, so that potential minimal pairs such as Ähre 'ear of grain' and Ehre 'honor' or Bären 'bears' and Beeren 'berries' are rendered homophonous, as /ˈɛːrə/ and /ˈbɛːrən/. Some authors claim that no distinction between /ɛː/ and /eː/ is possible in this position unless in hypercorrect pronunciation, in which Ehre and Beeren may be pronounced [ˈeːʁə] and [ˈbeːʁən], with a tense /eː/. Other authors claim that there is regional variation, a distinction occurring especially in southern varieties of Standard German. In contexts other than before intervocalic /r/, the contrast between /ɛː/ and /eː/ is more stable, so that bäten /ˈbɛːtən/ 'bid, conjunctive', Dänen /ˈdɛːnən/ 'Danes' and Sägen /ˈzɛːɡən/ ('saws, n.') may be differentiated from beten /ˈbeːtən/ 'to pray', dehnen /ˈdeːnən/ 'to stretch' and Segen /ˈzeːɡən/ 'blessing'. Even here the vowels can merge, but to a tense /eː/: [ˈbeːtn̩, ˈdeːnən, ˈzeːɡn̩]. Scholars who question the existence of a phoneme /ɛː/ do so for the following reasons:

1. The existence of a phoneme /ɛː/ is an irregularity in a vowel system that otherwise has pairs of long and tense vs. short and lax vowels such as /oː/ vs. /ɔ/.
2. The phoneme /ɛː/ has developed out of the spelling of the language rather than from any historical sound change. Most examples of Middle High German /ǣ/ correspond to New High German /eː/ rather than /ɛː/, indicating that the modern /ɛː/ is not a regular development.
3. Although some dialects (e.g. Ripuarian and some Alemannic dialects) have an opposition of /eː/ vs. /ɛː/, their usage does not follow that of the standard. There is also little agreement across dialects as to whether individual lexical items should be pronounced with /eː/ or with /ɛː/. E.g. South Hessian dialects have /eː/ in Käse but /ɛː/ in Leben.

=== Diphthongs ===
==== Phonemic ====
Diphthongs of standard German, from Dudenredaktion, Kleiner & Knöbl (2015:35)

| | Ending point | |
| | Front | Back |
|---|---|---|
| Near-close | (ʊɪ̯) | |
| Open-mid | ɔɪ̯ | |
| Open | aɪ̯ | aʊ̯ |

- /aɪ̯/ has been variously described as [äɪ], [äe̠] and [aɛ].
- /aʊ̯/ has been variously described as [äʊ], [äʊ̞], [äo̟] and [aɔ].
- /ɔɪ̯/ has been variously described as [ɔʏ], [ɔʏ̞], [ɔe̠] and [ɔœ].
- /ʊɪ̯/ is found only in a handful of interjections such as pfui [pfʊɪ̯] and hui [hʊɪ̯], and as an alternative to disyllabic [uː.ɪ] in words such as ruhig [ʁʊɪ̯ç].

==== Phonetic ====
The following usually are not counted among the German diphthongs as German speakers often feel they are distinct marks of "foreign words" (Fremdwörter). These appear only in loanwords:

- [o̯a], as in Croissant [kʁ̥o̯aˈsɑ̃], colloquially: [kʁ̥o̯aˈsaŋ].
- Many German speakers use [ɛɪ̯] and [ɔʊ̯] as adaptations of the English diphthongs /eɪ/ and /oʊ/ in English loanwords, according to Wiese (1996), or they replace them with the native German long vowels /eː/ and /oː/. Thus, the word okay may be pronounced [ɔʊ̯ˈkɛɪ̯] or /oːˈkeː/. However, Mangold (2005) and Krech et al. (2009) do not recognize these diphthongs as phonemes, and prescribe pronunciations with the long vowels /eː/ and /oː/ instead.

In the varieties where speakers vocalize /r/ to [ɐ] in the syllable coda, a diphthong ending in [ɐ̯] may be formed with every stressable vowel:

German diphthongs ending in [ɐ̯] (part 1), from Kohler (1999:88)

German diphthongs ending in [ɐ̯] (part 2), from Kohler (1999:88)

R-vocalization in Standard German
| Diphthong | | Example | | |
| Phonemically | Phonetically | IPA | Orthography | Translation |
|---|---|---|---|---|
| /ɪr/ | [ɪɐ̯] | [vɪɐ̯t] | wird | he/she/it becomes |
| /iːr/ | [iːɐ̯]^{1} | [viːɐ̯] | wir | we |
| /ʏr/ | [ʏɐ̯] | [ˈvʏɐ̯də] | Würde | dignity |
| /yːr/ | [yːɐ̯]^{1} | [fyːɐ̯] | für | for |
| /ʊr/ | [ʊɐ̯] | [ˈvʊɐ̯də] | wurde | I/he/she/it became |
| /uːr/ | [uːɐ̯]^{1} | [ˈuːɐ̯laʊ̯p] | Urlaub | holiday |
| /ɛr/ | [ɛɐ̯] | [ɛɐ̯ft] | Erft | Erft |
| /ɛr/ | [ɐ]^{2} | [ˈoːpɐ] | Oper | Opera |
| /ɛːr/ | [ɛːɐ̯]^{1} | [bɛːɐ̯] | Bär | bear |
| /eːr/ | [eːɐ̯]^{1} | [meːɐ̯] | mehr | more |
| /œr/ | [œɐ̯] | [dœɐ̯t] | dörrt | he/she/it dries |
| /øːr/ | [øːɐ̯]^{1} | [høːɐ̯] | hör! | (thou) hear! |
| /ɔr/ | [ɔɐ̯] | [ˈnɔɐ̯dn̩] | Norden | north |
| /oːr/ | [oːɐ̯]^{1} | [toːɐ̯] | Tor | gate |
| /ar/ | [aɐ̯] | [haɐ̯t] | hart | hard |
| /aːr/ | [aːɐ̯]^{1} | [vaːɐ̯] | wahr | true |

^1Wiese (1996) notes that the length contrast is not very stable before non-prevocalic /r/ and that "Meinhold & Stock (1980:180), following the pronouncing dictionaries (Mangold (1990), Krech & Stötzer (1982)) judge the vowel in Art, Schwert, Fahrt to be long, while the vowel in Ort, Furcht, hart is supposed to be short. The factual basis of this presumed distinction seems very questionable." He goes on stating that in his own dialect, there is no length difference in these words, and that judgements on vowel length in front of non-prevocalic /r/ which is itself vocalized are problematic, in particular if /a/ precedes.
According to the "lengthless" analysis, the aforementioned "long" diphthongs are analyzed as [iɐ̯], [yɐ̯], [uɐ̯], [ɛɐ̯], [eɐ̯], [øɐ̯], [oɐ̯] and [aɐ̯]. This makes non-prevocalic /ar/ and /aːr/ homophonous as [aɐ̯] or [aː]. Non-prevocalic /ɛr/ and /ɛːr/ may also merge, but the vowel chart in Kohler (1999) shows that they have somewhat different starting points – mid-centralized open-mid front [ɛ̽] for the former, open-mid front [ɛ] for the latter.
Wiese (1996) also states that "laxing of the vowel is predicted to take place in shortened vowels; it does indeed seem to go hand in hand with the vowel shortening in many cases." This leads to [iɐ̯], [yɐ̯], [uɐ̯], [eɐ̯], [øɐ̯], [oɐ̯] being pronounced the same as [ɪɐ̯], [ʏɐ̯], [ʊɐ̯], [ɛɐ̯], [œɐ̯], [ɔɐ̯]. This merger is usual in the Standard Austrian accent, in which e.g. Moor 'bog' is often pronounced [mɔɐ̯]; this, in contrast with the Standard Northern variety, also happens intervocalically, along with the diphthongization of the laxed vowel to [Vɐ̯], so that e.g. Lehrer 'teacher' is pronounced [ˈlɛɐ̯ʁɐ] (the corresponding Standard Northern pronunciation is [ˈleːʁɐ]). Another feature of the Standard Austrian accent is complete absorption of [ɐ̯] by the preceding /a, aː/, so that e.g. rar 'scarce' is pronounced [ʁɑː].

^2At the end of words only.

== Consonants ==
With around 22 to 26 phonemes, the German consonant system has an average number of consonants in comparison with other languages. One of the more noteworthy ones is the unusual affricate /pf/.

| | | Labial | Alveolar | Post- alveolar | Palatal | Velar/ Uvular | Glottal |
|---|---|---|---|---|---|---|---|
| Nasal | | m | n | | | ŋ | |
| Plosive | Fortis | p | t | | | k | (ʔ) |
| Plosive | Lenis | b | d | | | ɡ | |
| Affricate | Fortis | pf | ts | tʃ | | | |
| Affricate | Lenis | | | (dʒ) | | | |
| Fricative | Fortis | f | s | ʃ | ç | (x) | h |
| Fricative | Lenis | v | z | (ʒ) | | | |
| Approximant | | | l | | j | | |
| Rhotic | | | r | | | | |

- /r/ can be uvular, alveolar or even dental, a consonant or a semivowel, see below.
- /pf/ is bilabial–labiodental [pf], rather than purely labiodental [p̪f].
- /b, d, g, z, dʒ, ʒ/ are voiceless in Austrian Standard German and in most other South German varieties.
- /t, d, l, n/ can be apical alveolar [t̺, d̺, l̺, n̺], laminal alveolar [t̻, d̻, l̻, n̻] or laminal denti-alveolar [t̪, d̪, l̪, n̪]. The other possible pronunciation of /d/ that has been reported to occur in unstressed intervocalic positions is retroflex [ɖ]. Austrian German often uses laminal denti-alveolar articulation.
- /l/ is always clear [l], as in most Irish English accents. A few Austrian accents may use a velarized [ɫ] instead, but that is considered non-standard.
- In the Standard Austrian variety, /k/ may be affricated to [kx] before front vowels.
- /ts, s, z/ can be laminal alveolar [t̻s̻, s̻, z̻], laminal post-dental [t̪s̪, s̪, z̪] (i.e. fronted alveolar, articulated with the blade of the tongue just behind upper front teeth), or even apical alveolar [t̺s̺, s̺, z̺]. /s, z/ are always strongly fricated. Austrian German often uses the post-dental articulation for /s/.
- /tʃ, dʒ, ʃ, ʒ/ are strongly labialized palato-alveolar sibilants [tʃʷ, dʒʷ, ʃʷ, ʒʷ]. /ʃ, ʒ/ are fricated more weakly than /s, z/. There are two variants of these sounds:
  - Laminal, articulated with the foremost part of the blade of the tongue approaching the foremost part of the hard palate, with the tip of the tongue resting behind either upper or lower front teeth.
  - Apico-laminal, articulated with the tip of the tongue approaching the gums and the foremost part of the blade approaching the foremost part of the hard palate. According to Morciniec & Prędota (2005), this variant is used more frequently.
- /r/ has a number of possible realizations:
  - Voiced apical coronal trill [r̺], either alveolar (articulated with the tip of the tongue against the alveolar ridge), or dental (articulated with the tip of the tongue against the back of the upper front teeth).
    - Distribution: Common in the south (Bavaria and many parts of Switzerland and Austria), but it is also found in some speakers in central and northern Germany, especially the elderly. It is also one of possible realizations of /r/ in the Standard Austrian accent, but a more common alveolar realization is an approximant [ɹ]. Even more common are uvular realizations, fricatives [ʁ ~ χ] and a trill [ʀ].
  - Voiced uvular trill [ʀ], which can be realized as voiceless [ʀ̥] after voiceless consonants (as in treten). According to Lodge (2009) it is often a flap [ʀ̆] intervocalically (as in Ehre).
    - Distribution: Occurs in some conservative varieties—most speakers with a uvular /r/ realize it as a fricative or an approximant. It is also one of possible realizations of /r/ in the Standard Austrian accent, but it is less common than a fricative [ʁ ~ χ].
  - Dorsal continuant, about the quality of which there is not a complete agreement:
    - Krech et al. (2009) describe two fricative variants, namely post-palatal [ɣ˖] and velar [ɣ]. The post-palatal variant appears before and after front vowels, while the velar variant is used in all other positions.
    - Morciniec & Prędota (2005) describe it as a voiced post-velar fricative [ʁ̟].
    - Mangold (2005) and Kohler (1999) describe it as a voiced uvular fricative [ʁ];
      - Mangold (2005) states that "with educated professional radio and TV announcers, as with professional actors on the stage and in film, the [voiced uvular] fricative [realization of] /r/ clearly predominates."
        - In the Standard Austrian accent, the uvular fricative is also the most common realization, although its voicing is variable (that is, it can be either voiced [ʁ] or voiceless [χ]).
      - Kohler (1999) writes that "the place of articulation of the consonant varies from uvular in e.g. rot ('red') to velar in e.g. treten ('kick'), depending on back or front vowel contexts." He also notes that [ʁ] is devoiced after voiceless plosives and fricatives, especially those within the same word, giving the word treten as an example. According to this author, [ʁ] can be reduced to an approximant in an intervocalic position.
    - Ladefoged & Maddieson (1996) describe it as a uvular fricative [ʁ] or approximant [ʁ̞]. The latter is less likely to occur word-initially.
    - Distribution: Almost all areas apart from Bavaria and parts of Switzerland.
  - Retroflex approximant [ɻ] realized like the r in Standard American English.
    - Distribution: Middle Hessian between the Wetterau region and the Westerwald and the Higher Lusatia.
  - Near-open central unrounded vowel [ɐ] is a post-vocalic allophone of (mostly dorsal) varieties of /r/. The non-syllabic variant of it is not always near-open or central; it is similar to either [ɑ] or [ə], depending on the environment.
    - Distribution: Widespread, but less common in Switzerland.
- The voiceless stops /p/, /t/, /k/ are strongly aspirated at the start of a word or stressed syllable (except before a sibilant), word-finally before a pause, and in some suffixes; unaspirated before a sibilant in the same word; and weakly aspirated elsewhere. Many southern dialects do not aspirate /p t k/, and some northern ones do so only in a stressed position. The voiceless affricates /pf/, /ts/, and /tʃ/ are never aspirated, and neither are any other consonants besides the aforementioned /p, t, k/.
- The obstruents /b, d, ɡ, z, ʒ, dʒ/ are voiceless lenis consonants [b̥, d̥, ɡ̊, z̥, ʒ̊, d̥ʒ̊] in southern varieties. Voiceless lenis consonants [b̥, d̥, ɡ̊, z̥] continue to contrast with voiceless fortis consonants [p, t, k, s]. The section § Fortis–lenis pairs covers the issue in more detail.
- In Austria, intervocalic /b, d, ɡ/ can be lenited to fricatives [β, ð, ɣ].
- Before and after front vowels (/ɪ, iː, ʏ, yː, ɛ, ɛː, eː, œ, øː/ and, in varieties that realize them as front, /a/ and/or /aː/), the velar consonants /ŋ, k, ɡ/ are realized as post-palatal [ŋ˖, k̟, ɡ˖]. According to Wiese (1996), in a parallel process, /k, ɡ/ before and after back vowels (/ʊ, uː, ɔ, oː/ and, in varieties that realize them as back, /a/ and/or /aː/) are retracted to post-velar [k̠, ɡ˗] or even uvular [q, ɢ].
- There is no complete agreement about the nature of /j/; it has been variously described as:
  - a fricative [ʝ],
  - a fricative which can be fricated less strongly than [ç],
  - a sound variable between a weak fricative and an approximant, and
  - an approximant [j], which is the usual realization in the Standard Austrian variety.
- In many varieties of standard German, the glottal stop, [ʔ], occurs in careful speech before word stems that begin with a vowel and before stressed vowels word-internally, as in Oase [ʔo.ʔaː.zə] (twice). It is much more frequent in northern varieties than in the south. It is not usually considered a phoneme. In colloquial and dialectal speech, [ʔ] is often omitted, especially when the word beginning with a vowel is unstressed.
- The phonemic status of affricates is controversial. The majority view accepts /pf/ and /ts/, but not /tʃ/ or the non-native /dʒ/; some accept none, some accept all but /dʒ/, and some accept all.
  - Although [tʃ] occurs in native words, it only appears in historic clusters of /t/ + /ʃ/ (e.g. deutsch < OHG diutisc) or in words with expressive quality (e.g. glitschen, hutschen). [tʃ] is, however, well-established in loanwords, including German toponyms of non-Germanic origin (e.g. Zschopau).
  - [dʒ] and [ʒ] occur only in words of foreign origin. In certain varieties, they are replaced by [tʃ] and [ʃ] altogether.
- [ʋ] is occasionally considered to be an allophone of /v/, especially in southern varieties of German.
- [ç] and [x] are traditionally regarded as allophones after front vowels and back vowels, respectively. For a more detailed analysis see below at ich-Laut and ach-Laut. According to some analyses, [χ] is an allophone of /x/ after /a, aː/ and according to some also after /ʊ, ɔ, aʊ̯/. However, according to Moosmüller, Schmid & Brandstätter (2015), the uvular allophone is used after /ɔ/ only in the Standard Austrian variety.
- Some phonologists do not posit a separate phoneme /ŋ/ and use /nɡ/ instead, along with /nk/ instead of /ŋk/. The phoneme sequence /nɡ/ is realized as [ŋɡ] when /ɡ/ can start a valid onset of the next syllable whose nucleus is a vowel other than unstressed /ə/, /ɪ/, or /ʊ/. It becomes [ŋ] otherwise. For example:
  - Diphthong /dɪfˈtɔnɡ/ [dɪfˈtɔŋ]
  - diphthongieren /dɪftɔnˈɡiːrən/ [ˌdɪftɔŋˈɡiːʁən]
  - Englisch /ˈɛnɡlɪʃ/ [ˈɛŋlɪʃ]
  - Anglo /ˈanɡloː/ [ˈaŋɡloː]
  - Ganges /ˈɡanɡəs/ [ˈɡaŋəs] ~ /ˈɡanɡɛs/ [ˈɡaŋɡɛs]

=== Ich-Laut and ach-Laut ===
A map showing the German dialect area with black/white squares indicating the Ich-Laut and the Ach-Laut

Ich-Laut is the voiceless palatal fricative [ç] (which is found in the word ich [ɪç] 'I'), and ach-Laut is the voiceless velar fricative [x] (which is found in the word ach [ax] the interjection 'oh', 'alas'). Laut [laʊ̯t] is the German word for 'sound, phone'. In German, these two sounds are allophones occurring in complementary distribution. The allophone [x] occurs after back vowels and /a aː/ (for instance in Buch [buːx] 'book'), the allophone [ç] after front vowels (for instance in mich [mɪç] 'me/myself') and consonants (for instance in Furcht [fʊʁçt] 'fear', manchmal [ˈmançmaːl] 'sometimes'). The allophone [ç] also appears after vocalized ⟨r⟩ in superregional variants, e.g. in Furcht [fʊɐ̯çt] 'fear'. In southeastern regiolects, the ach-Laut is commonly used here, yielding [fʊɐ̯xt].

In loanwords, the pronunciation of potential fricatives in onsets of stressed syllables varies: in the Northern varieties of standard German, it is [ç], while in Southern varieties, it is [k], and in Western varieties, it is [ʃ] (for instance in China: [ˈçiːna] vs. [ˈkiːna] vs. [ˈʃiːna]).

The diminutive suffix -chen is always pronounced with an ich-Laut [-çən]. Usually, this ending triggers umlaut (compare for instance Hund [hʊnt] 'dog' to Hündchen [ˈhʏntçn̩] 'little dog'), so theoretically, it could only occur after front vowels. However, in some comparatively recent coinings, there is no longer an umlaut, for instance in the word Frauchen [ˈfʁaʊ̯çən] (a diminutive of Frau 'woman'), so that a back vowel is followed by a [ç], even though normally it would be followed by a [x], as in rauchen [ˈʁaʊ̯xən] ('to smoke'). This exception to the allophonic distribution may be an effect of the morphemic boundary or an example of phonemicization, where erstwhile allophones undergo a split into separate phonemes.

The allophonic distribution of [ç] after front vowels and [x] after other vowels is also found in other languages, such as Scots, e.g. licht [lɪçt] 'light', dochter [ˈdɔxtər] 'daughter', and the same distribution is reconstructed for Middle English. However, it is by no means inevitable: Dutch, Yiddish, and many Upper German dialects retain [x] (which can be realized as [χ] instead) in all positions. It is thus reasonable to assume that Old High German ih, the ancestor of modern ich, was pronounced with [x] rather than [ç]. While it is impossible to know for certain whether Old English words such as niht (modern night) were pronounced with [x] or [ç], [ç] is likely (see Old English phonology).

Despite the phonetic history, the complementary distribution of [ç] and [x] in modern Standard German is better described as backing of /ç/ after a back vowel, rather than fronting of /x/ after a front vowel, because [ç] is used in onsets (Chemie [çeˈmiː] 'chemistry') and after consonants (Molch [mɔlç] 'newt'), and is thus the underlying form of the phoneme.

According to Kohler, the German ach-Laut is further differentiated into two allophones, [x] and [χ]: [x] occurs after /uː, oː/ (for instance in Buch [buːx] 'book') and [χ] after /a, aː/ (for instance in Bach [baχ] 'brook'), while either [x] or [χ] may occur after /ʊ, ɔ, aʊ̯/, with [χ] predominating.

In Western varieties, there is a strong tendency to realize /ç/ as unrounded [ʃ] or [ɕ], and the phoneme may be confused or merged with /ʃ/ altogether, secondarily leading to hypercorrection effects where /ʃ/ is replaced with /ç/, for instance in Fisch [fɪʃ], which may be realized as [fɪç].

Within German dialects, a large variation exists as to the environments which trigger or prevent one realization or the other.

=== Fortis–lenis pairs ===
Various German consonants occur in pairs at the same place of articulation and in the same manner of articulation, namely the pairs /p–b/, /t–d/, /k–ɡ/, /s–z/, /ʃ–ʒ/. These pairs are often called fortis–lenis pairs, since describing them as voiced–voiceless pairs is inadequate. With certain qualifications, /tʃ–dʒ/, /f–v/ and /θ–ð/ are also considered fortis–lenis pairs.

Fortis-lenis distinction for /ʔ, m, n, ŋ, l, r, h/ is unimportant.

The fortis stops /p, t, k/ are aspirated in many varieties. The aspiration is strongest in the onset of a stressed syllable (such as Taler [ˈtʰaːlɐ] 'thaler'), weaker in the onset of an unstressed syllable (such as Vater [ˈfaːtʰɐ] 'father'), and weakest in the syllable coda (such as in Saat [zaːtʰ] 'seed'). All fortis consonants, i.e. /p, t, k, f, θ, s, ʃ, ç, x, pf, ts, tʃ/ are fully voiceless.

The lenis consonants /b, d, ɡ, v, ð, z, ʒ, j, r, dʒ/ range from being weakly voiced to almost voiceless [b̥, d̥, ɡ̊, v̥, ð̥, z̥, ʒ̊, j̥, r̥, d̥ʒ̊] after voiceless consonants: Kasbah [ˈkasb̥a] ('kasbah'), abdanken [ˈapd̥aŋkn̩] ('to resign'), rotgelb [ˈʁoːtɡ̊ɛlp] ('red-yellow'), Abwurf [ˈapv̥ʊʁf] ('dropping'), Absicht [ˈapz̥ɪçt] ('intention'), Holzjalousie [ˈhɔltsʒ̊aluziː] ('wooden jalousie'), wegjagen [ˈvɛkj̥aːɡn̩] ('to chase away'), tropfen [ˈtʁ̥ɔpfn̩] ('to drop'), Obstjuice [ˈoːpstd̥ʒ̊uːs] ('fruit juice'). Mangold (2005) states that they are "to a large extent voiced" [b, d, ɡ, v, ð, z, ʒ, j, r, dʒ] in all other environments, but some studies have found the stops /b, d, ɡ/ to be voiceless utterance-initially in most dialects (and word-initially if the preceding sounds are voiceless, see above). In these cases, they still contrast with /p, t, k/ due to the aspiration of the latter. Due to this variability, there are disagreements about the phonological nature of the contrast: while some phonologists analyse the lenes stops as underlyingly voiced, others consider the relevant feature to be tenseness or spreading of the glottis (with the fortis stops being tense or articulated with spread glottis.

/b, d, ɡ, z, ʒ/ are voiceless in most southern varieties of German. For clarity, they are often transcribed as [b̥, d̥, ɡ̊, z̥, ʒ̊].

The nature of the phonetic difference between the voiceless lenis consonants and the similarly voiceless fortis consonants is controversial. It is generally described as a difference in articulatory force, and occasionally as a difference in articulatory length; for the most part, it is assumed that one of these characteristics implies the other.

In various central and southern varieties, the opposition between fortis and lenis is neutralized in the syllable onset; sometimes just in the onset of stressed syllables, sometimes in all cases.

The pair /f–v/ is not considered a fortis–lenis pair, but a simple voiceless–voiced pair, as /v/ remains voiced in all varieties, including the Southern varieties that devoice the lenes (with however some exceptions). Generally, the southern /v/ is realized as the voiced approximant [ʋ]. However, there are southern varieties which differentiate between a fortis /f/ (such as in sträflich [ˈʃtʁɛːflɪç] 'culpable' from Middle High German stræflich) and a lenis /f/ ([v̥], such as in höflich [ˈhøːv̥lɪç] 'polite' from Middle High German hovelîch); this is analogous to the opposition of fortis /s/ ([s]) and lenis [z̥].

==== Coda devoicing ====
In varieties from Northern Germany, lenis stops in the syllable coda are realized as fortis stops. This does not happen in varieties from Southern Germany, Austria or Switzerland. (Note: See Ammon et al. (2004, p. LVII).)

Phonologists who believe that the relevant feature behind the fortes-lenes contrast is not phonetic voice have also argued that this cannot be called devoicing in the strict sense of the word because it does not involve the loss of voice. In their view, it can be called coda fortition or a neutralization of fortis and lenis sounds in the coda. Fricatives, on the other hand, are acknowledged to be truly and contrastively voiced in Northern Germany (Note: In Southern Germany, Austria or Switzerland there is no phonetic voice in fricatives either, see Ammon et al. (2004, p. LVII).), so they can be said to undergo coda devoicing according to this account as well. It is disputed whether coda devoicing is due to a constraint which specifically operates on syllable codas or whether it arises from constraints which "protect voicing in privileged positions".

== Stress ==
In German words there is always one syllable carrying main stress, with all other syllables either being unstressed or carrying a secondary stress. The position of the main stress syllable has been a matter of debate. Traditionally, word stress is seen as falling onto the first stem syllable. In recent analyses, there is agreement that main stress is placed onto one of the last three (stressable) syllables. Within this three-syllable window, word stress is put regularly onto the second-to-last syllable, the penultimate syllable. However, syllable quantity may modify this pattern: a heavy final or prefinal syllable, i.e., one with a long vowel or with one or more consonants in the syllable coda, will usually attract main stress.

Examples

- final stress: Eleˈfant, Krokoˈdil, Kaˈmel
- penultimate stress: ˈTurban, ˈKonsul, ˈBison
- antepenultimate stress: ˈPinguin, ˈRisiko, ˈMonitor

A set of illustrative examples also stems from Japanese loan words, as these cannot be borrowed with their stress patterns (Japanese has a system of pitch accents, completely different from word stress in Germanic languages):

- final stress: Shoˈgun, Samuˈrai
- penultimate stress: Mitsuˈbishi, Ikeˈbana
- antepenultimate stress: Hiˈroshima, ˈOsaka

A list of Japanese words in German reveals that none of the words with four syllables has initial stress, confirming the three-syllable-window analysis.

Secondary stresses precede the main stress if at least two syllables are present, as in ̩Bib-li- ̩o-the-'ka-rin.

Suffixes, if containing a stressable vowel, are either stressed (-ei, ion, -al, etc.) or unstressed (-ung, -heit, -isch, etc.)

In addition, German uses different stresses for separable prefixes and inseparable prefixes in verbs and words derived from such verbs:

- Words beginning with be-, ge-, er-, ver-, zer-, ent-, emp- and a few other inseparable prefixes are stressed on the root.
- Words beginning with the separable prefixes ab-, auf-, ein-, vor-, and most prepositional adverbs are stressed on the prefix.
- Some prefixes, notably über-, unter-, um-, and durch-, can function as separable or inseparable prefixes and are stressed or not accordingly.
- A few homographs with such prefixes exist. They are not perfect homophones. Consider the word umschreiben. As ˈum•schreiben (separable prefix), it means 'to rewrite' and is pronounced [ˈʊmʃʁaɪ̯bən], with stress on the first syllable. Its associated noun, die ˈUmschreibung is also stressed on the first syllable – [ˈʊmʃʁaɪ̯bʊŋ]. On the other hand, umˈschreiben (inseparable prefix) is pronounced [ʊmˈʃʁaɪ̯bən], with stress on the second syllable. This word means 'to paraphrase', and its associated noun, die Umˈschreibung is also stressed on the second syllable – [ʊmˈʃʁaɪ̯bʊŋ]. Another example is the word umˈfahren; with stress on the root ([ʊmˈfaːʁən]) it means 'to drive around (an obstacle in the street)', and with stress on the prefix ([ˈʊmfaːʁən]) it means 'to run down/over' or 'to knock down'.

== Acquisition ==
=== General ===
Like all infants, German infants go through a babbling stage in the early phases of phonological acquisition, during which they produce the sounds they will later use in their first words. Phoneme inventories begin with stops, nasals, and vowels; (contrasting) short vowels and liquids appear next, followed by fricatives and affricates, and finally all other consonants and consonant clusters. Children begin to produce protowords near the end of their first year. These words do not approximate adult forms, yet have a specific and consistent meaning. Early word productions are phonetically simple and usually follow the syllable structure CV or CVC, although this generalization has been challenged. The first vowels produced are /ə/, /a/, and /aː/, followed by /eː/, /iː/, and /ɛ/, with rounded vowels emerging last. German children often use phonological processes to simplify their early word production. For example, they may delete an unstressed syllable (Schokolade 'chocolate' pronounced [ˈlaːdə]), or replace a fricative with a corresponding stop (Dach [dax] 'roof' pronounced [dak]). One case study found that a 17-month-old child acquiring German replaced the voiceless velar fricative [x] with the nearest available continuant [h], or deleted it altogether (Buch [buːx] 'book' pronounced [buh] or [buː]).

Prosodically, children prefer bisyllabic words with the pattern strong – weak over monosyllabic words.

=== Vowel space development ===
In 2009, Lintfert examined the development of vowel space of German speakers in their first three years of life. During the babbling stage, vowel distribution has no clear pattern. However, stressed and unstressed vowels already show different distributions in the vowel space. Once word production begins, stressed vowels expand in the vowel space, while the F_{1} – F_{2} vowel space of unstressed vowels becomes more centralized. The majority of infants are then capable of stable production of F_{1}. The variability of formant frequencies among individuals decreases with age. After 24 months, infants expand their vowel space individually at different rates. However, if the parents' utterances possess a well-defined vowel space, their children produce clearly distinguished vowel classes earlier. By about three years old, children command the production of all vowels, and they attempt to produce the four cardinal vowels, /y/, /i/, /u/ and /a/, at the extreme limits of the F1–F2 vowel space (i.e., the height and backness of the vowels are made extreme by the infants).

=== Nasals ===
The acquisition of nasals in German differs from that of Dutch, a phonologically closely related language. German children produce proportionately more nasals in onset position (sounds before a vowel in a syllable) than Dutch children do. German children, once they reached 16 months, also produced significantly more nasals in syllables containing schwas, when compared with Dutch-speaking children. This may reflect differences in the languages the children are being exposed to, although the researchers claim that the development of nasals likely cannot be seen apart from the more general phonological system the child is developing.

=== Phonotactic constraints and reading ===
A 2006 study examined the acquisition of German in phonologically delayed children (specifically, issues with fronting of velars and stopping of fricatives) and whether they applied phonotactic constraints to word-initial consonant clusters containing these modified consonants. In many cases, the subjects (mean age = 5.1) avoided making phonotactic violations, opting instead for other consonants or clusters in their speech. This suggests that phonotactic constraints do apply to the speech of German children with phonological delay, at least in the case of word-initial consonant clusters. Additional research has also shown that spelling consistencies seen in German raise children's phonemic awareness as they acquire reading skills.

== Sound changes ==
=== Sound changes and mergers ===
A common merger is that of /ɡ/ at the end of a syllable with [ç] or [x], for instance Krieg [kʁ̥iːç] ('war'), but Kriege [ˈkʁ̥iːɡə] ('wars'); er lag [laːx] ('he lay'), but wir lagen [ˈlaːɡən] ('we lay'). This pronunciation is frequent all over central and northern Germany. It is characteristic of regional languages and dialects, particularly Low German in the North, where ⟨g⟩ represents a fricative, becoming voiceless in the syllable coda, as is common in German (final-obstruent devoicing). However common it is, this pronunciation is considered sub-standard. Only in one case, in the grammatical ending -ig (which corresponds to English -y), the fricative pronunciation of final ⟨g⟩ is prescribed by the Siebs standard, for instance wichtig [ˈvɪçtɪç] ('important'), Wichtigkeit [ˈvɪçtɪçkaɪt] ('importance'). The merger occurs neither in Austro-Bavarian and Alemannic German nor in the corresponding varieties of Standard German, and therefore in these regions -ig is pronounced [ɪɡ̊].

Many speakers do not distinguish the affricate /pf/ from the simple fricative /f/ in the beginning of a word, in which case the verb (er) fährt ('(he) travels') and the noun Pferd ('horse') are both pronounced [fɛɐ̯t]. This most commonly occurs in northern and western Germany, where the local dialects did not originally have the sound /pf/. Some speakers also have peculiar pronunciation for /pf/ in the middle or end of a word, replacing the [f] in /pf/ with a voiceless bilabial fricative, i.e. a consonant produced by pressing air flow through the tensed lips. Thereby Tropfen ('drop') becomes [ˈtʁ̥ɔpɸn̩], rather than [ˈtʁ̥ɔpfn̩].

Many speakers who have a vocalization of /r/ after /a/ merge this combination with long /aː/ (i.e. /ar/ > *[aɐ] or *[ɑɐ] > [aː] or [ɑː]). Hereby, Schaf ('sheep') and scharf ('sharp') can both be pronounced [ʃaːf] or [ʃɑːf]. This merger does not occur where /a/ is a front vowel while /aː/ is realised as a back vowel. Here the words are kept distinct as [ʃɑːf] ('sheep') and [ʃaːf] ('sharp'). Another tactic is the merger of /ar/ with /aːr/ as [ɑː], producing a monophthong distinct from /aː/ ([äː]). Such speakers too keep Schaf [ʃaːf] distinct from scharf [ʃɑːf], but with reverse qualities. Especially the last type of distinction is difficult to perceive to speakers who do not have it in their own speech and can still sound like a merger (both [äː] and [ɑː] are very common realizations of the plain /aː/).

In umlaut forms, the difference usually reoccurs: Schäfer [ˈʃɛːfɐ] or [ˈʃeːfɐ] vs. schärfer [ˈʃɛɐ̯fɐ]. Speakers with this merger also often use [aːç] (instead of formally normal /aːx/) where it stems from original [arç]. The word Archen ('arks') is thus pronounced [ˈaːçn̩], which makes a minimal pair with Aachen [ˈaːxn̩], arguably making the difference between [ç] and [x] phonemic, rather than just allophonic, for these speakers. Again, the difference could still be found in vowel quality: [ˈɑːçn̩] vs. [ˈaːxn̩], or [ˈaːçn̩] vs. [ˈɑːxn̩].

In the standard pronunciation, the vowel qualities /iː/, /ɪ/, /eː/, /ɛ/, as well as /uː/, /ʊ/, /oː/, /ɔ/, are all still distinguished even in unstressed syllables. In this latter case, however, many simplify the system in various degrees. For some speakers, this may go so far as to merge all four into one, hence misspellings by schoolchildren such as Bräutegam (instead of Bräutigam) or Portogal (instead of Portugal).

In everyday speech, more mergers occur, some of which are universal and some of which are typical for certain regions or dialect backgrounds. Overall, there is a strong tendency of reduction and contraction. For example, long vowels may be shortened, consonant clusters may be simplified, word-final [ə] may be dropped in some cases, and the suffix -en may be contracted with preceding consonants, e.g. [ham] for haben [ˈhaːbən] ('to have').

If the clusters [mp], [lt], [nt], or [ŋk] are followed by another consonant, the stops /p/, /t/ and /k/ usually lose their phonemic status. Thus while the standard pronunciation distinguishes ganz [ɡants] ('whole') from Gans [ɡans] ('goose'), as well as er sinkt [zɪŋkt] from er singt [zɪŋt], the two pairs are homophones for most speakers. The commonest practice is to drop the stop (thus [ɡans], [zɪŋt] for both words), but some speakers insert the stop where it is not etymological ([ɡants], [zɪŋkt] for both words), or they alternate between the two ways. Only a few speakers retain a phonemic distinction.

=== Middle High German ===
The Middle High German vowels [ei̯] and [iː] developed into the modern Standard German diphthong [aɪ̯], whereas [ou̯] and [uː] developed into [aʊ̯]. For example, Middle High German heiz /hei̯s/ and wîz /wiːs/ ('hot' and 'white') became Standard German heiß /haɪ̯s/ and weiß /vaɪ̯s/. In some dialects, the Middle High German vowels have not changed, e.g. Swiss German heiss /hei̯s/ and wiiss /viːs/, while in other dialects or languages, the vowels have changed but the distinction is kept, e.g. Bavarian hoaß /hɔɐ̯s/ and weiß /vaɪ̯s/, Ripuarian heeß /heːs/ and wieß /viːs/ (however the Colognian dialect has kept the original [ei] diphthong in heiß), Yiddish הײס heys /hɛɪ̯s/ and װײַס vays /vaɪ̯s/.

The Middle High German diphthongs [iə̯], [uə̯] and [yə̯] became the modern Standard German long vowels [iː], [uː] and [yː] after the Middle High German long vowels changed to diphthongs. Most Upper German dialects retain the diphthongs. A remnant of their former diphthong character is shown when [iː] continues to be written ie in German (as in Liebe 'love').

== Loanwords ==
German incorporates a significant number of loanwords from other languages. Loanwords are often adapted to German phonology but to varying degrees, depending on the speaker and the commonness of the word. /ʒ/ and /dʒ/ do not occur in native German words but are common in a number of French and English loan words. Many speakers replace them with /ʃ/ and /tʃ/ respectively (especially in Southern Germany, Austria and Switzerland), so that Dschungel (from English jungle) can be pronounced [ˈdʒʊŋl̩] or [ˈtʃʊŋl̩]. Some speakers in Northern and Western Germany merge /ʒ/ with /dʒ/, so that Journalist (phonemically /dʒʊrnaˈlɪst ~ ʒʊrnaˈlɪst/) can be pronounced [ʒʊɐ̯naˈlɪst], [dʒʊɐ̯naˈlɪst] or [ʃʊɐ̯naˈlɪst]. The realization of /ʒ/ as [tʃ], however, is uncommon.

=== Loanwords from English ===
Many English words are used in German, especially in technology and pop culture. Some speakers pronounce them similarly to their native pronunciation, but many speakers change non-native phonemes to similar German phonemes (even if they pronounce them in a rather English manner in an English-language setting):

- English /θ, ð/ are usually pronounced as in RP or General American; some speakers replace them with /s/ and /z/ respectively (th-alveolarization) e.g. Thriller [ˈθʁɪlɐ ~ ˈsʁɪlɐ].
- English /ɹ/ can be pronounced the same as in English, i.e. [ɹ], or as the corresponding native German /r/ e.g. Rock [ʁɔk] or [rɔk]. German and Austrian speakers tend to be variably rhotic when using English loanwords.
- English /w/ is often replaced with German /v/ e.g. Whisk(e)y [ˈvɪskiː].
- word-initial /s/ is often retained (especially in the South, where word-initial /s/ is common), but many speakers replace it with /z/ e.g. Sound [zaʊ̯nt].
- word-initial /st/ and /sp/ are usually retained, but some speakers (especially in South Western Germany and Western Austria) replace them with /ʃt/ and /ʃp/ e.g. Steak [ʃteɪk] or [ʃteːk], Spray [ʃpʁeɪ] or [ʃpʁeː].
- English /tʃ/ is usually retained, but in Northern and Western Germany as well as Luxembourg, it is often replaced with /ʃ/ e.g. Chips [ʃɪps].
- In Northern Standard German, final-obstruent devoicing is applied to English loan words just as to other words e.g. Airbag [ˈɛːɐ̯bɛk], Lord [lɔʁt] or [lɔɐ̯t], Backstage [ˈbɛksteːtʃ]. However, in Southern Standard German, in Swiss Standard German and Austrian Standard German, final-obstruent devoicing does not occur and so speakers are more likely to retain the original pronunciation of word-final lenes (although realizing them as fortes may occur because of confusing English spelling with pronunciation).
- English /eɪ/ and /oʊ/ are often replaced with /eː/ and /oː/ respectively e.g. Homepage [ˈhoːmpeːtʃ].
- English /æ/ and /ɛ/ are pronounced the same, as German /ɛ/ (met–mat merger) e.g. Backup [ˈbɛkap].
- English /ɒ/ and /ɔː/ are pronounced the same, as German /ɔ/ (cot–caught merger) e.g. Box [bɔks].
- English /ʌ/ is usually pronounced as German /a/ e.g. Cutter [ˈkatɐ].
- English /ɜːr/ is usually pronounced as German /œʁ/ e.g. Shirt [ʃœʁt] or [ʃœɐ̯t].
- English /i/ is pronounced as /iː/ (happy-tensing) e.g. Whisk(e)y [ˈvɪskiː].

=== Loanwords from French ===
French loanwords, once very numerous, have in part been replaced by native German coinages or more recently English loanwords. Besides /ʒ/, they can also contain the characteristic nasal vowels [ãː], [ɛ̃ː], [œ̃ː] and [õː] (always long). However, their status as phonemes is questionable and they are often resolved into sequences either of (short) oral vowel and [ŋ] (in the north), or of (long or short) oral vowel and [n] or sometimes [m] (in the south). For example, Ballon [baˈlõː] ('balloon') may be realized as [baˈlɔŋ] or [baˈloːn], Parfüm [paʁˈfœ̃ː] ('perfume') as [paʁˈfœŋ] or [paʁˈfyːm] and Orange [oˈʁãːʒə] ('orange') as [oˈʁaŋʒə] or [oˈʁanʒə].

== Sample ==
The sample text is a reading of "The North Wind and the Sun". The phonemic transcription treats [ə] as an allophone of [ɛ] and every instance of [ɐ] and [ɐ̯] as /ɛr/ and /r/, respectively. The phonetic transcription is a fairly narrow transcription of the educated northern accent. The speaker transcribed in the narrow transcription is 62 years old, and he is reading in a colloquial style. Aspiration, glottal stops and devoicing of the lenes after fortes are not transcribed.

The audio file contains the whole fable and was recorded by a much younger speaker.

=== Phonemic transcription ===
/aɪnst ˈʃtrɪtɛn zɪç ˈnɔrtvɪnt ʊnt ˈzɔnɛ | veːr fɔn ˈiːnɛn ˈbaɪdɛn voːl deːr ˈʃtɛrkɛrɛ ˈvɛːrɛ | als aɪn ˈvandɛrɛr | deːr ɪn ˈaɪnɛn ˈvarmɛn ˈmantɛl ɡɛˈhʏlt vaːr | dɛs ˈveːɡɛs daˈheːrˌkaːm ‖ ziː ˈvʊrdɛn ˈaɪnɪç | das ˈdeːrjeːnɪɡɛ fyːr deːn ˈʃtɛrkɛrɛn ˈɡɛltɛn ˈzɔltɛ | deːr deːn ˈvandɛrɛr ˈtsvɪŋɛn ˈvʏrdɛ | ˈzaɪnɛn ˈmantɛl ˈaptsuːˌneːmɛn ‖ deːr ˈnɔrtvɪnt bliːs mɪt ˈalɛr maxt | ˈaːbɛr jeː ˈmeːr eːr bliːs | ˈdɛstoː ˈfɛstɛr ˈhʏltɛ zɪç deːr ˈvandɛrɛr ɪn ˈzaɪnɛn ˈmantɛl aɪn ‖ ˈɛntlɪç ɡaːp deːr ˈnɔrtvɪnt deːn kampf aʊf ‖ nuːn ɛrˈvɛrmtɛ diː ˈzɔnɛ diː lʊft mɪt ˈiːrɛn ˈfrɔɪntlɪçɛn ˈʃtraːlɛn | ʊnt ʃoːn naːx ˈveːnɪɡɛn aʊɡɛnˈblɪkɛn tsoːk deːr ˈvandɛrɛr ˈzaɪnɛn ˈmantɛl aʊs ‖ daː ˈmʊstɛ deːr ˈnɔrtvɪnt ˈtsuːɡeːbɛn | das diː ˈzɔnɛ fɔn ˈiːnɛn ˈbaɪdɛn deːr ˈʃtɛrkɛrɛ vaːr/

The North Wind and the Sun
Traditional fable

=== Phonetic transcription ===
[aɪns ˈʃtʁɪtn̩ zɪç ˈnɔɐ̯tvɪnt ʊntˈz̥ɔnə | veːɐ̯ fɔn ˈiːnː ˈbaɪdn̩ voːl deːɐ̯ ˈʃtɛɐ̯kəʁə ˈvɛːʁə | als aɪn ˈvandəʁɐ | deːɐ̯ ɪn ˈaɪnː ˈvaːɐ̯mn̩ ˈmantl̩ ɡəˈhʏlt vaːɐ̯ | dəs ˈveːɡəs daˈheːɐ̯kaːm ‖ ziː ˈvʊɐ̯dn̩ ˈaɪnɪç | das ˈdeːɐ̯jeːnɪɡə fʏɐ̯ deːn ˈʃtɛɐ̯kəʁən ˈɡɛltn̩ ˈzɔltə | deːɐ̯ deːn ˈvandəʁɐ ˈtsvɪŋ̍ ˈvʏɐ̯də | ˈzaɪnː ˈmantl̩ ˈaptsʊˌneːmː ‖ deːɐ̯ ˈnɔɐ̯tvɪnt bliːs mɪt ˈalɐ maxt | ˈaːbɐ jeˈmeːɐ̯ eːɐ̯ bliːs | ˈdɛsto ˈfɛstɐ ˈhʏltə zɪç deːɐ̯ ˈvandəʁɐ ɪn ˈzaɪnː ˈmantl̩ aɪn ‖ ˈɛntlɪç ɡaːp deːɐ̯ ˈnɔɐ̯tvɪnt deːn kampf aʊf ‖ nuːn ɛɐ̯ˈvɛɐ̯mtə diː ˈzɔnə diː lʊft mɪt ˈiːɐ̯n̩ ˈfʁɔɪntlɪçn̩ ˈʃtʁaːln̩ | ʊnt ʃoːnaːx ˈveːnɪɡŋ̍ aʊɡŋ̍ˈblɪkŋ̍ tsoːk deːɐ̯ ˈvandəʁɐ ˈzaɪnː ˈmantl̩ aʊs ‖ daː ˈmʊstə deːɐ̯ ˈnɔɐ̯tvɪnt ˈtsuːɡeːbm̩ | das diː ˈzɔnə fɔn ˈiːnː ˈbaɪdn̩ deːɐ̯ ˈʃtɛɐ̯kəʁə vaːɐ̯]

=== Orthographic version ===
Einst stritten sich Nordwind und Sonne, wer von ihnen beiden wohl der Stärkere wäre, als ein Wanderer, der in einen warmen Mantel gehüllt war, des Weges daherkam. Sie wurden einig, daß derjenige für den Stärkeren gelten sollte, der den Wanderer zwingen würde, seinen Mantel abzunehmen. Der Nordwind blies mit aller Macht, aber je mehr er blies, desto fester hüllte sich der Wanderer in seinen Mantel ein. Endlich gab der Nordwind den Kampf auf. Nun erwärmte die Sonne die Luft mit ihren freundlichen Strahlen, und schon nach wenigen Augenblicken zog der Wanderer seinen Mantel aus. Da mußte der Nordwind zugeben, daß die Sonne von ihnen beiden der Stärkere war.

== See also ==
- German orthography
