= Stage pronunciation =

Stage pronunciation may refer to:

- Bühnendeutsch in the German theatre
- Mid-Atlantic accent in the English-speaking American theatre
