= Firuzabad District =

Firuzabad District may refer to:

- Firuzabad District (Kermanshah County), Kermanshah province, Iran
- Firuzabad District (Selseleh County), Lorestan province, Iran
- Firuzabad Rural District, Lorestan province, Iran
- Firuzabad District (Chaharborj County), West Azerbaijan province, Iran
