= Voiced uvular fricative =

Consonantal sound represented by ⟨ʁ⟩ in IPA

ʁ
- IPA number: 143

Audio sample
- source · help

Encoding
- Entity (decimal): &#641;
- Unicode (hex): U+0281
- X-SAMPA: R
- Braille: ⠔ (braille pattern dots-35) ⠼ (braille pattern dots-3456)
Image

Voiced uvular approximant

ʁ̞

Audio sample
- source · help

Encoding
- X-SAMPA: R_o
Image

A voiced uvular fricative is a type of consonantal sound, used in some spoken languages. The symbol in the International Phonetic Alphabet that represents this sound is ⟨ʁ⟩, an inverted small capital letter ⟨ʀ⟩, or in broad transcription ⟨r⟩ if rhotic. This consonant is one of the several collectively called guttural R when found in European languages.

A voiced uvular approximant is also found interchangeably with the fricative, and may also be transcribed as ⟨ʁ⟩. Because the IPA symbol stands for the uvular fricative, the approximant may be specified by adding the downtack: ⟨ʁ̞⟩, though some writings use a superscript ⟨ʶ⟩, which is not an official IPA practice.

For a voiced pre-uvular fricative (also called post-velar), see voiced velar fricative § Voiced pre-uvular fricative.

== Features ==
Features of a voiced uvular fricative:

- Its manner of articulation is fricative, which means it is produced by constricting air flow through a narrow channel at the place of articulation, causing turbulence. In many languages it is closer to an approximant, however, and no language distinguishes the two at the uvular articulation.
- Its place of articulation is uvular, which means it is articulated with the back of the tongue (the dorsum) at the uvula.
- Its phonation is voiced, which means the vocal cords vibrate during the articulation.
- It is an oral consonant, which means that air is not allowed to escape through the nose.
- It is a median consonant, which means it is produced by directing the airstream down the midline of the tongue, rather than to the sides.
- Its airstream mechanism is pulmonic, which means it is articulated by pushing air only with the intercostal muscles and abdominal muscles, as in most speech sounds.

== Occurrence ==
In Western Europe, an uvular trill pronunciation of rhotic consonants spread from northern French to several dialects and registers of Basque, Catalan, Danish, Dutch, German, Judaeo-Spanish, Norwegian, Occitan, Portuguese, Swedish, some variants of Low Saxon, and Yiddish. However, not all of them remain a uvular trill today. In Brazilian Portuguese, it is usually a velar fricative ([x], [ɣ]), voiceless uvular fricative [χ], or glottal transition ([h], [ɦ]), except in southern Brazil, where alveolar and uvular trills as well as the voiced uvular fricative predominate. Because such uvular rhotics often do not contrast with alveolar ones, IPA transcriptions may often use ⟨r⟩ to represent them for ease of typesetting. For more information, see guttural R.

Ladefoged & Maddieson (1996) note, "There is... a complication in the case of uvular fricatives in that the shape of the vocal tract may be such that the uvula vibrates."

It is also present in most Turkic languages, except for Turkish, and in Caucasian languages. It may also occur as [ɣ].

Language		Word	IPA	Meaning	Notes
Abkhaz		цыҕ / cëğ	[tsəʁ]	'marten'	See Abkhaz phonology
Adyghe		тыгъэ / tëğa / تہغە	[təʁa]	'sun'	
Afrikaans	Parts of the former Cape Province	rooi	[ʁoːi̯]	'red'	May be a trill [ʀ] instead. See Afrikaans phonology
Albanian	Arbëresh Some Moresian accents	vëlla	[vʁa]	'brother'	May be pronounced as a normal double l. Sometimes, the guttural r is present in words starting with g in some dialects.
Aleut	Atkan dialect	chamĝul	[tʃɑmʁul]	'to wash'	
Arabic	Modern Standard	غرفة / ġurfa	[ˈʁʊrfɐ]	'room'	Mostly transcribed as /ɣ/, may be velar, post-velar or uvular, depending on dialect. See Arabic phonology
Archi		гъӀабос / ġabos	[ʁˤabos]	'croak'	Pharyngealized.
Armenian		ղեկ / ġek	[ʁɛk]	'rudder'	
Asturian		gatu	[ˈʁat̪u]	'cat'	Allophone of /ɣ/. May be an approximant. See IPA/Astur-Leonese
Avar		тIагъур / thaġur / طاغۇر	[tʼaˈʁur]	'cap'	
Azerbaijani	Southern dialects such as in Maragha, Malekan, Binab, Ajab shir and Leylan counties of East Azerbaijan, and Chaharburj, Miyandoab alongside Baruq in West Azerbaijan	yeralma / یئرآلما	[jeʁɑlma]	'potato'	Unlike many of Turkic dialects that have solely adapted the pronunciation of <r> into a voiced alveolar trill, these dialects often use voiced uvular fricative or they might use close-mid back unrounded vowel almost entirely in their speeches as an equivalent of r. it also has to be noted that this is not the same as voiced velar fricative which is to be resembled with ğ.
Bashkir		туғыҙ / tuğıð / توعئذ	[tuˈʁɤð]	'nine'	
Basque	Northern dialects	urre	[uʁe]	'gold'	
Catalan	Northern	córrer	[ˈkuʁə]	'to run'	See Catalan phonology
Chilcotin		relkɨsh	[ʁəlkɪʃ]	'he walks'	
Danish	Standard	rød	[ʁ̞œ̠ð̠]	'red'	Most often an approximant when initial. In other positions, it can be either a fricative (also described as voiceless [χ]) or an approximant. Also described as pharyngeal [ʕ̞]. It can be a fricative trill in word-initial positions when emphasizing a word. See Danish phonology
Dutch	Belgian Limburg	rad	[ʁɑt]	'wheel'	Either a fricative or an approximant. Realization of /r/ varies considerably among dialects. See Dutch phonology
Dutch	Central Netherlands	rad	[ʁɑt]	'wheel'	Either a fricative or an approximant. Realization of /r/ varies considerably among dialects. See Dutch phonology
Dutch	East Flanders	rad	[ʁɑt]	'wheel'	Either a fricative or an approximant. Realization of /r/ varies considerably among dialects. See Dutch phonology
Dutch	Northern Netherlands	rad	[ʁɑt]	'wheel'	Either a fricative or an approximant. Realization of /r/ varies considerably among dialects. See Dutch phonology
Dutch	Randstad	rad	[ʁɑt]	'wheel'	Either a fricative or an approximant. Realization of /r/ varies considerably among dialects. See Dutch phonology
Dutch	Southern Netherlands	rad	[ʁɑt]	'wheel'	Either a fricative or an approximant. Realization of /r/ varies considerably among dialects. See Dutch phonology
English	Dyfed	red	[ʁɛd]	'red'	Not all speakers. Alveolar in other Welsh accents.
English	Gwynedd	red	[ʁɛd]	'red'	Not all speakers. Alveolar in other Welsh accents.
English	North-east Leinster	red	[ʁɛd]	'red'	Corresponds to [ɹ ~ ɾ ~ ɻ] in other dialects of English in Ireland.
English	Northumbrian	red	[ʁɛd]	'red'	Described both as a fricative and an approximant. More rarely it is a trill [ʀ]. Mostly found in rural areas of Northumberland and northern County Durham, declining. See English phonology and Northumbrian Burr.
English	Sierra Leonean	red	[ʁɛd]	'red'	More rarely a trill [ʀ].
French		rester	[ʁɛste]	'to stay'	See French phonology
German	Standard	Rost	[ʁɔstʰ]	'rust'	Either a fricative or, more often, an approximant. In free variation with a uvular trill. See Standard German phonology
German	Lower Rhine	Rost	[ʁɔstʰ]	'rust'	Either a fricative or, more often, an approximant. In free variation with a uvular trill. See Standard German phonology
German	Swabian	Rost	[ʁ̞oʃt]	'rust'	An approximant. It is the realization of /ʁ/ in onsets, otherwise it is an epiglottal approximant.
Gondi	Hill-Maṛia	pār̥-	[paːʁ-]	'to sing'	Corresponds to /r/ or /ɾ/ in other Gondi dialects.
Hebrew	Modern	עוֹרֵב	[ʔoˈʁ̞ev]	'crow'	See Modern Hebrew phonology.
Inuktitut	East Inuktitut dialect	marruuk	[mɑʁːuːk]	'two'	
Italian	Some speakers	raro	[ˈʁäːʁo]	'rare'	Rendition alternative to the standard Italian alveolar trill [r], due to individual orthoepic defects and/or regional variations that make the alternative sound more prevalent, notably in Alto Adige (bordering with German-speaking Austria), Val d'Aosta (bordering with France) and in parts of the Parma province, more markedly around Fidenza. Other alternative sounds may be a uvular trill [ʀ] or a labiodental approximant [ʋ]. See Italian phonology.
Kabardian		бгъэ / bğa / بغە	[bʁa]	'eagle'	
Kabyle		ⴱⴻⵖ / bbeɣ / بغ	[bːəʁ]	'to dive'	
Kazakh		саған / sağan / ساعان	[sɑˈʁɑn]	'to you'	
Kyrgyz		жамгыр / camğır' / جامعىر	[dʒɑmˈʁɯr]	'rain'	
Lakota		aǧúyapi	[aʁʊjapɪ]	'bread'	
Luxembourgish		Parmesan	[ˈpʰɑʁməzaːn]	'Parmesan'	Appears as an allophone of /ʀ/ between a vowel and a voiced consonant and as an allophone of /ʁ/ between a back vowel and another vowel (back or otherwise). A minority of speakers use it as the only consonantal variety of /ʀ/ (in a complementary distribution with [χ]), also where it is trilled in the standard language. See Luxembourgish phonology
Malay	Kedah	ramai راماي	[ʁamaj]	'many'	Corresponds to prevocalic and intervocalic Standard Malay /r/. Word-finally, Standard Malay /r/ corresponds to /ʕ/ in Kedah Malay. See Kedah Malay
Malay	Perak	Perak ڤيراق	[peʁɑk̚]	'Perak'	See Malay phonology
Malay	Sarawak	ramai راماي	[ʁami]	'many'	Found within the Sibu dialect. Other dialects use velar [ɣ]. See Sarawak Malay
Malto		पोग़े	[poʁe]	'smoke'	May be a stop [ɢ] instead.
Minangkabau	Kampar dialect	boghe	[boʁe]	'rice'	
Norwegian	Southern dialects	rar	[ʁ̞ɑːʁ̞]	'strange'	Either an approximant or a fricative. See Norwegian phonology
Norwegian	Southwestern dialects	rar	[ʁ̞ɑːʁ̞]	'strange'	Either an approximant or a fricative. See Norwegian phonology
Toba qom	Takshek dialect	Awo~~g~~oyk	[awoʁojk]	'moon'	
Tundra Nenets	Some speakers	вара	[waʁa]	'goose'	
Ossetic	Iron	æгъгъæд / æğğæd	[ˈəʁːəd]	'enough'	
Portuguese	European	carro	[ˈkaʁu]	'car'	Word-initial /ʁ/ is commonly realized as a uvular trill [ʀ] in Lisbon. See Portuguese phonology
Portuguese	Setubalense	ruralizar	[ʁuʁɐɫiˈzaʁ]	'to ruralize'	Outcome of a merger of /ɾ/ with /ʁ/, which is unique in the Lusophone world. Often trilled instead.
Portuguese	Fluminense	ardência	[ɐʁˈdẽsjə]	'burning feeling'	Due to 19th century Portuguese influence, Rio de Janeiro's dialect merged coda /ɾ/ into /ʁ/. Often trilled. In free variation with [ɣ], [ʕ] and [ɦ] before voiced sounds, [x], [χ], [ħ] and [h] before voiceless consonants
Portuguese	Sulista	arroz	[ɐˈʁos]	'rice'	Due to 19th century Portuguese influence, Rio de Janeiro's dialect merged coda /ɾ/ into /ʁ/. Often trilled. In free variation with [ɣ], [ʕ] and [ɦ] before voiced sounds, [x], [χ], [ħ] and [h] before voiceless consonants
Spanish	Puerto Rican	carro	[ˈkaʁo]	'car'	Word-initial, and inter-vocallic double r ('rr') /r/ are commonly realized as a fricative trill in rural sectors and generally (but not exclusively) lower socioeconomic strata among Puerto Ricans. [ʁ].
Spanish	As spoken in Asturias	gusano	[ʁ̞uˈsano]	'worm'	Most common allophone of /g/. May also be an approximant.
Swedish	Southern dialects	rör	[ʁɶʁ]	'pipe(s)'	See Swedish phonology
Tatar		яңгыр / yañğır / ياڭگئر	[jɒŋˈʁɯr]	'rain'	
Turkmen		aɡyr / آغیٛر	[ɑʁɨɾ]	'heavy'	An allophone of /ɣ/ next to back vowels
Tsez		агъи / aɣi	[ˈʔaʁi]	'bird'	
Ubykh		[ʁa]		'his'	Ubykh has ten different uvular fricatives. See Ubykh phonology
Uyghur		ئۇيغۇر / Уйғур	[ʊjʁʊr]	'Uyghur'	
Uzbek		ogʻir / оғир / اۉغیر	[ɒˈʁɨr]	'heavy'	
Yakut		тоҕус / toğus	[toʁus]	'nine'	
Yi		Ğņyņə	[ʁŋêŋĕ]	'twenty'	A fricative or approximant.
Yiddish		רעגן	[ʁɛɡŋ]	'rain'	See Yiddish phonology
Zhuang		roek	[ʁɔ̌k]	'six'	

== See also ==
- Index of phonetics articles
- Guttural

== Notes ==
Place →	Labial					Coronal										Dorsal					Laryngeal			
Manner ↓	Bilabial		Labiodental		Linguolabial		Dental		Alveolar		Postalveolar		Retroflex		(Alveolo-)palatal		Velar		Uvular		Pharyngeal/epiglottal		Glottal	
Nasal	m̥	m	ɱ̊	ɱ		n̼	n̪̊	n̪	n̥	n	n̠̊	n̠	ɳ̊	ɳ	ɲ̊	ɲ	ŋ̊	ŋ	ɴ̥	ɴ				
Plosive	p	b	p̪	b̪	t̼	d̼	t̪	d̪	t	d			ʈ	ɖ	c	ɟ	k	ɡ	q	ɢ	ʡ		ʔ	
Sibilant affricate							t̪s̪	d̪z̪	ts	dz	t̠ʃ	d̠ʒ	tʂ	dʐ	tɕ	dʑ								
Non-sibilant affricate	pɸ	bβ	p̪f	b̪v			t̪θ	d̪ð	tɹ̝̊	dɹ̝	t̠ɹ̠̊˔	d̠ɹ̠˔			cç	ɟʝ	kx	ɡɣ	qχ	ɢʁ	ʡʜ	ʡʢ	ʔh	
Sibilant fricative							s̪	z̪	s	z	ʃ	ʒ	ʂ	ʐ	ɕ	ʑ								
Non-sibilant fricative	ɸ	β	f	v	θ̼	ð̼	θ	ð	θ̠	ð̠	ɹ̠̊˔	ɹ̠˔	ɻ̊˔	ɻ˔	ç	ʝ	x	ɣ	χ	ʁ	ħ	ʕ	h	ɦ
Approximant		β̞		ʋ				ð̞		ɹ		ɹ̠		ɻ		j		ɰ						˷
Tap/flap		ⱱ̟		ⱱ					ɾ̥	ɾ			ɽ̊	ɽ						ɢ̆		ʡ̆		
Trill	ʙ̥	ʙ							r̥	r		r̠	ɽ̊r̥	ɽr					ʀ̥	ʀ	ʜ	ʢ		
Lateral affricate									tɬ	dɮ			tꞎ	d𝼅	c𝼆	ɟʎ̝	k𝼄	ɡʟ̝						
Lateral fricative							ɬ̪		ɬ	ɮ			ꞎ	𝼅	𝼆	ʎ̝	𝼄	ʟ̝						
Lateral approximant								l̪	l̥	l		l̠	ɭ̊	ɭ	ʎ̥	ʎ	ʟ̥	ʟ		ʟ̠				
Lateral tap/flap									ɺ̥	ɺ			𝼈̊	𝼈		ʎ̆		ʟ̆						

		BL	LD	D	A	PA	RF	P	V	U
Implosive	Voiced	ɓ			ɗ		ᶑ	ʄ	ɠ	ʛ
Implosive	Voiceless	ɓ̥			ɗ̥		ᶑ̊	ʄ̊	ɠ̊	ʛ̥
Ejective	Stop	pʼ			tʼ		ʈʼ	cʼ	kʼ	qʼ
Ejective	Affricate		p̪fʼ	tθʼ	tsʼ	tʃʼ	tʂʼ	tɕʼ	kxʼ	qχʼ
Ejective	Fricative	ɸʼ	fʼ	θʼ	sʼ	ʃʼ	ʂʼ	ɕʼ	xʼ	χʼ
Ejective	Lateral affricate				tɬʼ			c𝼆ʼ	k𝼄ʼ	q𝼄ʼ
Ejective	Lateral fricative				ɬʼ					
Click (top: velar; bottom: uvular)	Tenuis	kʘ qʘ		kǀ qǀ	kǃ qǃ		k𝼊 q𝼊	kǂ qǂ		
Click (top: velar; bottom: uvular)	Voiced	ɡʘ ɢʘ		ɡǀ ɢǀ	ɡǃ ɢǃ		ɡ𝼊 ɢ𝼊	ɡǂ ɢǂ		
Click (top: velar; bottom: uvular)	Nasal	ŋʘ ɴʘ		ŋǀ ɴǀ	ŋǃ ɴǃ		ŋ𝼊 ɴ𝼊	ŋǂ ɴǂ	ʞ	
Click (top: velar; bottom: uvular)	Tenuis lateral				kǁ qǁ					
Click (top: velar; bottom: uvular)	Voiced lateral				ɡǁ ɢǁ					
Click (top: velar; bottom: uvular)	Nasal lateral				ŋǁ ɴǁ					
