= Fesenduz Rural District =

Rural district in West Azerbaijan province, Iran

Fesenduz Rural District Persian: دهستان فسندوز
- Rural District
- Location within Iran
- Coordinates: 37°08′N 45°50′E
- Country: Iran
- Province: West Azerbaijan
- County: Chaharborj
- District: Firuzabad
- Established: 2021
- Capital: Fesenduz
- Time zone: UTC+3:30 (IRST)

Fesenduz Rural District (Persian: دهستان فسندوز) is in Firuzabad District of Chaharborj County, West Azerbaijan province, Iran. Its capital is the village of Fesenduz, whose population at the time of the 2016 National Census was 2,461 in 726 households.

== History ==
In 2021, Marhemetabad District (Note: Renamed the Central District of Chaharborj County) was separated from Miandoab County in the establishment of Chaharborj County and renamed the Central District. Fesenduz Rural District was created in the new Firuzabad District.

== Other villages in the rural district ==
- Moradkhanlu
- Qareh Qowzlu
