= Guttural sound =

Pronounced using the throat

Guttural speech sounds are those with a primary place of articulation near the back of the oral cavity, where it is difficult to distinguish a sound's place of articulation and its phonation. In popular usage, it is an imprecise term for sounds produced relatively far back in the vocal tract, such as the German ch or the Arabic heth and ayin, but not simple glottal sounds like h. The term 'guttural language' is used for languages that have such sounds.

As a technical term used by phoneticians and phonologists, guttural has had various definitions. Guttural sounds are typically consonants, but murmured, pharyngealized, glottalized and strident vowels may also be considered guttural in nature. The concept always includes pharyngeal–epiglottal consonants, but may also include velar, uvular, or glottal consonants. These each fit into more narrow groups:

	Guttural places of articulation			
	Velar	Uvular	Pharyngeal–epiglottal	Glottal
Dorsal	Yes		No	
Faucal	No	Yes		No
Laryngeal	No		Yes	

- Velar and uvular consonants are dorsal consonants (though palatal consonants may also be considered dorsal, and are never included under guttural).
- Uvular and pharyngeal–epiglottal consonants are sometimes grouped under the term faucal consonants.
- Pharyngeal–epiglottal and glottal consonants are sometimes grouped under the term laryngeal consonants.

Some phonologists argue that all post-velar sounds constitute a natural class.

== Meaning and etymology ==
The word guttural literally means 'of the throat' (from Latin guttur, meaning throat), and was first used by phoneticians to describe the Hebrew glottal [ʔ] (א) and [h] (ה), uvular [χ] (ח) (for Israeli Hebrew speakers), and pharyngeal [ħ] (ח) and [ʕ] (ע).

English speakers commonly use the term non-technically, especially in America, to refer to sounds that subjectively appear harsh or grating. This definition usually includes several consonants that are not used in American English, such as epiglottals [ʜ] and [ʡ], uvulars (namely fricatives [χ] and [ʁ], stops [q] and [ɢ], and nasal [ɴ]), and velars (only fricatives [x] and [ɣ]). However, it usually excludes sounds used in English, such as the velar stops [k] and [ɡ], the velar nasal [ŋ], and the glottal consonants [h] and [ʔ].

== Guttural languages ==
In popular consciousness, languages that make extensive use of guttural consonants are often considered to be guttural languages. Some English-speakers sometimes find such languages strange and even hard on the ear.

=== Examples of significant usage ===
Languages that extensively use the velar and uvular guttural consonants [x, ɣ, q, ɢ, χ, ʁ] include: Afrikaans, Arabic, Armenian, Assamese, Assyrian, Azerbaijani, Bengali (in the eastern dialects due to the debuccalization, and other varieties of Bengali considered to be their own languages; see Bengali phonology), Breton, Crimean Tatar, Dutch, English (some dialects including Scots, Scottish English and Irish/Hiberno-English), French, German, Greek, Hebrew, Hindustani (Hindi–Urdu), Inuktitut, Irish, Kartvelian languages (i.e., Georgian, Mingrelian, Laz, Svan), Kazakh, Kurdish, Kyrgyz, Lakota, Mandarin Chinese, Manx, Mongolian, Noakhali, Pashto, Persian (including Tajik) Punjabi, Russian, Scots, Scottish Gaelic, Sindhi, Spanish, Sylheti, Tamil (chiefly in Brahmin Tamil as well as in the non-standard variety of Sri Lankan Tamil due to the debuccalization; see Tamil phonology), Tswana, Turkmen, Uzbek, Uyghur, Vedic Sanskrit (i.e., the jihvāmūlīya (ᳵ ẖ) represented by the visarga), and Welsh.

In addition to their usage of the aforementioned consonants, the following languages also use the pharnygeal gutturals [ħ, ʕ]: Berber languages (i.e. Kabyle, Tamasheq), Gwenedeg, Cushitic languages (i.e. Somali and Oromo) Anatolian Turkish dialects (as a result of borrowings from Arabic), Northeast Caucasian languages (i.e. Chechen, Lezgian, Avar), Northwest Caucasian (i.e. Abkhaz, Adyghe, Kabardian), Salishan and Wakashan language families in British Columbia, and Semitic languages (i.e. Arabic, Sureth, Tigre, Tigrinya, Turoyo, Hebrew, Ge’ez).

=== Examples of partial usage ===
In French, the only truly guttural sound is (usually) a voiced uvular fricative (or the guttural R). In Portuguese, [ʁ] is becoming dominant in urban areas. There is also a realization as a [χ], and the original pronunciation as an [r] also remains very common in various dialects.

In Russian, /x/ is assimilated to the palatalization of the following velar consonant: лёгких [ˈlʲɵxʲkʲɪx]. It also has a voiced allophone [ɣ], which occurs before voiced obstruents. In Romanian, /h/ becomes the velar [x] in word-final positions (duh 'spirit') and before consonants (hrean 'horseradish'). In Czech, the phoneme /x/ followed by a voiced obstruent can be realized as either [ɦ] or [ɣ], e.g. abych byl [abɪɣ.bɪl].

In Kyrgyz, the consonant phoneme /k/ has a uvular realisation ([q]) in back vowel contexts. In front-vowel environments, /ɡ/ is fricativised between continuants to [ɣ], and in back vowel environments both /k/ and /ɡ/ fricativise to [χ] and [ʁ] respectively. In Uyghur, the phoneme /ʁ/ occurs with a back vowel. In the Mongolian language, /x/ is usually followed by /ŋ/.

The Tuu and Juu (Khoisan) languages of southern Africa have large numbers of guttural vowels. These sounds share certain phonological behaviors that warrant the use of a term specifically for them. There are scattered reports of pharyngeals elsewhere, such as in the Nilo-Saharan, Tama language.

In Swabian German, a pharyngeal approximant [ʕ] is an allophone of /ʁ/ in nucleus and coda positions. In onsets, it is pronounced as a uvular approximant. In Danish, /ʁ/ may have slight frication, and, according to Ladefoged & Maddieson (1996), it may be a pharyngeal approximant [ʕ]. In Finnish, a weak pharyngeal fricative is the realization of /h/ after the vowels /ɑ/ or /æ/ in syllable-coda position, e.g. tähti [tæħti] 'star'.

== See also ==
- Guttural R
- Laryngeal consonant

== Bibliography ==
- Abdel-Massih, Ernest T. (1971b). A Reference Grammar of Tamazight. Ann Arbor: University of Michigan. ISBN 0-932098-05-3.
- Bauer, Michael Blas na Gàidhlig - The Practical Guide to Gaelic Pronunciation (2011), Akerbeltz. ISBN 978-1-907165-00-9
- Beyer, Klaus (1986). The Aramaic language: its distribution and subdivisions. Göttingen: Vandenhoeck und Ruprecht. ISBN 3-525-53573-2.
- Brenzinger, Matthias (2007). Language Diversity Endangered. Berlin: Mouton de Gruyter. ISBN 978-3-11-017049-8.
- Chaker, Salem (1996). Tira n Tmaziɣt – propositions pour la notation usuelle a base latine du berbere (PDF). Problèmes en suspens de la notation usuelle à base latine du berbère (in French). Paris: INALCO. Archived from the original (PDF) on November 29, 2008.
- Creissels, Denis (2006). The construct form of nouns in African languages: a typological approach (PDF). 36th Colloquium on African Languages and Linguistics. Archived from the original (PDF) on 2011-07-28.
- Dum-Tragut, Jasmine (2009), Armenian: Modern Eastern Armenian, Amsterdam: John Benjamins Publishing Company
- An Introduction to Syriac Studies. Piscataway, NJ: Gorgias Press. ISBN 1-59333-349-8.
- Kavitskaya, Darya (2010). Crimean Tatar. Munich: Lincom Europa.
- Kyzlasov I.L. Runic scripts of Eurasian steppes, Восточная литература (Eastern Literature), Moscow, 1994, pp. 80 on, ISBN 5-02-017741-5
- Ladefoged, Peter; Maddieson, Ian (1996). The Sounds of the World's Languages. Oxford: Blackwell. ISBN 0-631-19815-6.

Place →	Labial					Coronal										Dorsal					Laryngeal			
Manner ↓	Bilabial		Labiodental		Linguolabial		Dental		Alveolar		Postalveolar		Retroflex		(Alveolo-)palatal		Velar		Uvular		Pharyngeal/epiglottal		Glottal	
Nasal	m̥	m	ɱ̊	ɱ		n̼	n̪̊	n̪	n̥	n	n̠̊	n̠	ɳ̊	ɳ	ɲ̊	ɲ	ŋ̊	ŋ	ɴ̥	ɴ				
Plosive	p	b	p̪	b̪	t̼	d̼	t̪	d̪	t	d			ʈ	ɖ	c	ɟ	k	ɡ	q	ɢ	ʡ		ʔ	
Sibilant affricate							t̪s̪	d̪z̪	ts	dz	t̠ʃ	d̠ʒ	tʂ	dʐ	tɕ	dʑ								
Non-sibilant affricate	pɸ	bβ	p̪f	b̪v			t̪θ	d̪ð	tɹ̝̊	dɹ̝	t̠ɹ̠̊˔	d̠ɹ̠˔			cç	ɟʝ	kx	ɡɣ	qχ	ɢʁ	ʡʜ	ʡʢ	ʔh	
Sibilant fricative							s̪	z̪	s	z	ʃ	ʒ	ʂ	ʐ	ɕ	ʑ								
Non-sibilant fricative	ɸ	β	f	v	θ̼	ð̼	θ	ð	θ̠	ð̠	ɹ̠̊˔	ɹ̠˔	ɻ̊˔	ɻ˔	ç	ʝ	x	ɣ	χ	ʁ	ħ	ʕ	h	ɦ
Approximant		β̞		ʋ				ð̞		ɹ		ɹ̠		ɻ		j		ɰ						˷
Tap/flap		ⱱ̟		ⱱ					ɾ̥	ɾ			ɽ̊	ɽ						ɢ̆		ʡ̆		
Trill	ʙ̥	ʙ							r̥	r		r̠	ɽ̊r̥	ɽr					ʀ̥	ʀ	ʜ	ʢ		
Lateral affricate									tɬ	dɮ			tꞎ	d𝼅	c𝼆	ɟʎ̝	k𝼄	ɡʟ̝						
Lateral fricative							ɬ̪		ɬ	ɮ			ꞎ	𝼅	𝼆	ʎ̝	𝼄	ʟ̝						
Lateral approximant								l̪	l̥	l		l̠	ɭ̊	ɭ	ʎ̥	ʎ	ʟ̥	ʟ		ʟ̠				
Lateral tap/flap									ɺ̥	ɺ			𝼈̊	𝼈		ʎ̆		ʟ̆						

		BL	LD	D	A	PA	RF	P	V	U
Implosive	Voiced	ɓ			ɗ		ᶑ	ʄ	ɠ	ʛ
Implosive	Voiceless	ɓ̥			ɗ̥		ᶑ̊	ʄ̊	ɠ̊	ʛ̥
Ejective	Stop	pʼ			tʼ		ʈʼ	cʼ	kʼ	qʼ
Ejective	Affricate		p̪fʼ	tθʼ	tsʼ	tʃʼ	tʂʼ	tɕʼ	kxʼ	qχʼ
Ejective	Fricative	ɸʼ	fʼ	θʼ	sʼ	ʃʼ	ʂʼ	ɕʼ	xʼ	χʼ
Ejective	Lateral affricate				tɬʼ			c𝼆ʼ	k𝼄ʼ	q𝼄ʼ
Ejective	Lateral fricative				ɬʼ					
Click (top: velar; bottom: uvular)	Tenuis	kʘ qʘ		kǀ qǀ	kǃ qǃ		k𝼊 q𝼊	kǂ qǂ		
Click (top: velar; bottom: uvular)	Voiced	ɡʘ ɢʘ		ɡǀ ɢǀ	ɡǃ ɢǃ		ɡ𝼊 ɢ𝼊	ɡǂ ɢǂ		
Click (top: velar; bottom: uvular)	Nasal	ŋʘ ɴʘ		ŋǀ ɴǀ	ŋǃ ɴǃ		ŋ𝼊 ɴ𝼊	ŋǂ ɴǂ	ʞ	
Click (top: velar; bottom: uvular)	Tenuis lateral				kǁ qǁ					
Click (top: velar; bottom: uvular)	Voiced lateral				ɡǁ ɢǁ					
Click (top: velar; bottom: uvular)	Nasal lateral				ŋǁ ɴǁ					
