= Max Mangold =

Swiss-German linguist and phonetician

Max Mangold (German: [ˈmaks ˈmaŋɡɔlt]; 8 May 1922 – 3 February 2015) was a Swiss-German linguist and phonetician. He was born in the village of Pratteln near Basel, Switzerland and taught phonetics, phonology and linguistic theory at the University of the Saarland in Germany. He produced phonetic notation for numerous reference works and pronunciation dictionaries, among them the Duden dictionary of German pronunciation. His many contributions to German phonology are seminal and comprehensive. He also oversaw scientific theses, dissertations (nearly 100 of them, many the first and only records of endangered languages) and other publications, for example on dialects in the Saarland and the Rhineland-Palatinate.

Mangold showed a strong interest in linguistic matters in his early years and learned many languages, including Esperanto, actively speaking nearly 40 languages in his prime. The foreign language that he spoke best was probably Italian.

He studied in Basel, Geneva, Paris and London. His work afterwards included service as an interpreter for the United Nations from 1953–1954 during the Korean War for French, German, English, Russian, Polish, Czech, Slovak, Swedish and Chinese. After receiving his doctorate under Walther von Wartburg and habilitation in Basel in 1956, he was appointed a full professor of phonetics at the University of the Saarland in Germany in 1957 after lecturing at universities in Basel, Zurich and Bonn.
