= Chahar Borj =

City in West Azerbaijan province, Iran

Chahar Borj Persian: چهاربرج
- City
- Location within Iran
- Coordinates: 37°07′32″N 45°58′42″E
- Country: Iran
- Province: West Azerbaijan
- County: Chaharborj
- District: Central

Population (2016)
  - Total: 9,406
- Time zone: UTC+3:30 (IRST)

Chahar Borj (Persian: چهاربرج) (Note: Also romanized as Chahār Borj; also known as Chahār Borj-e Qadīm (چهار برج قدیم) and Chahār Borj-e Bālā; formerly Charbish and Charbysh) is a city in the Central District (Note: Formerly Marhemetabad District of Miandoab County) of Chaharborj County, West Azerbaijan province, Iran, serving as capital of both the county and the district. It is 23 kilometres (14 mi) from the south shore of Lake Urmia and 21 kilometres (13 mi) northwest of the city of Miandoab. As the village of Chahar Borj-e Qadim, it was the capital of Marhemetabad-e Shomali Rural District until the capital was transferred to the village of Shabanlu.

== Demographics ==
=== Population ===
At the time of the 2006 National Census, the city's population was 7,940 in 1,937 households, when it was in Marhemetabad District (Note: Renamed the Central District of Chaharborj County) of Miandoab County. The following census in 2011 counted 8,681 people in 2,496 households. The 2016 census measured the population of the city as 9,406 people in 2,793 households.

In 2021, the district was separated from the county in the establishment of Chaharborj County and renamed the Central District, with Chahar Borj as the new county's capital.
