= Siebs's law =

Proto-Indo-European sound law

Siebs's law (/ˈziːps/ ZEEPS) is a Proto-Indo-European (PIE) phonological rule named after the German linguist Theodor Siebs. According to this law, if an s-mobile is added to a root that starts with a voiced or aspirated stop, that stop is allophonically devoiced.

Compare:

PIE *bʰr̥Hg- > Latin fragor,
but *s-bʰr̥Hg- > PIE *spʰr̥Hg- > Sanskrit sphūrjati.

== Discussion ==
Siebs proposed this law in the Zeitschrift für vergleichende Sprachforschung auf dem Gebiete der indogermanischen Sprachen ('Journal for Comparative Linguistic Research in the Field of Indo-European Languages'), as Anlautstudien ('Initial Sound Studies'). Oswald Szemerényi rejected this rule, explaining that it is untenable and cites the contradiction present in Avestan zdī from PIE *s-dʰi "be!" as counterproof. However, the PIE form is more accurately reconstructed as *h₁s-dʰí from *h₁es- (so not an s-mobile) and thus Siebs' law appears to demand that the sibilant and aspirated stop are both adjacent and tautosyllabic, something which is known to only occur in word-initial position in Proto-Indo-European anyway.

== See also ==
- Glossary of sound laws in the Indo-European languages

== Sources ==
- Collinge, N. E. (1985). The Laws of Indo-European. John Benjamins Publishing Co. ISBN 978-0-915027-75-0.
- Szemerényi, Oswald (1999). Introduction to Indo-European Linguistics. Oxford University Press. ISBN 978-0-19-823870-6.
- Siebs, Theodore (1904). Zeitschrift für vergleichende Sprachforschung auf dem Gebiete der indogermanischen Sprachen.
