= Qepchaq Rural District =

Rural district in West Azerbaijan province, Iran

Qepchaq Rural District Persian: دهستان قپچاق
- Rural District
- Location within Iran
- Coordinates: 37°09′N 45°56′E
- Country: Iran
- Province: West Azerbaijan
- County: Chaharborj
- District: Central
- Established: 2021
- Capital: Qepchaq
- Time zone: UTC+3:30 (IRST)

Qepchaq Rural District (Persian: دهستان قپچاق) is in the Central District (Note: Formerly Marhemetabad District of Miandoab County) of Chaharborj County, West Azerbaijan province, Iran. Its capital is the village of Qepchaq, whose population at the time of the 2016 National Census was 3,669 in 1,098 households.

== History ==
In 2021, Marhemetabad District (Note: Renamed the Central District of Chaharborj County) was separated from Miandoab County in the establishment of Chaharborj County and renamed the Central District. Qepchaq Rural District was created in the same district.

== Other villages in the rural district ==
- Aghdash
- Ebrahim Hesari
- Mansurabad
