= Qarah Gozlu =

Qarah Gozlu قره گزلو
- Village
- Location within Iran
- Coordinates: 30°00′32″N 52°27′25″E
- Country: Iran
- Province: Fars
- County: Sepidan
- Bakhsh: Beyza
- Rural District: Beyza

Population (2006)
  - Total: 366
- Time zone: UTC+3:30 (IRST)
  - Summer (DST): UTC+4:30 (IRDT)

Qarah Gozlu (Persian: قره گزلو, also Romanized as Qarah Gozlū; also known as Qaraguzlu, Qareh Gowzlū, Shamsābād-e Qareh Gozlū, and Shamsābād-e Qoroq) is a village in Beyza Rural District, Beyza District, Sepidan County, Fars province, Iran. At the 2006 census, its population was 366, in 83 families.
