= Qareh Gowzlu, East Azerbaijan =

Qareh Gowzlu قره گوزلو
- Village
- Location within Iran
- Coordinates: 38°37′00″N 47°25′00″E
- Country: Iran
- Province: East Azerbaijan
- County: Ahar
- Bakhsh: Central
- Rural District: Vargahan

Population (2006)
  - Total: 15
- Time zone: UTC+3:30 (IRST)
  - Summer (DST): UTC+4:30 (IRDT)

Qareh Gowzlu (Persian: قره گوزلو, also Romanized as Qareh Gowzlū) is a village in Vargahan Rural District, in the Central District of Ahar County, East Azerbaijan Province, Iran. At the 2006 census, its population was 15, in 5 families.
