= Marhemetabad-e Miyani Rural District =

Rural district in West Azerbaijan province, Iran

Marhemetabad-e Miyani Rural District Persian: دهستان مرحمتآباد مياني
- Rural District
- Location within Iran
- Coordinates: 37°05′N 45°57′E
- Country: Iran
- Province: West Azerbaijan
- County: Chaharborj
- District: Firuzabad
- Established: 1997
- Capital: Firuzabad

Population (2016)
  - Total: 6,667
- Time zone: UTC+3:30 (IRST)

Marhemetabad-e Miyani Rural District (Persian: دهستان مرحمتآباد مياني) is in Firuzabad District of Chaharborj County, West Azerbaijan province, Iran. Its capital is the village of Firuzabad.

== Demographics ==
=== Population ===
At the time of the 2006 National Census, the rural district's population (as a part of Marhemetabad District (Note: Renamed the Central District of Chaharborj County) in Miandoab County) was 6,739 in 1,526 households. There were 6,839 inhabitants in 1,836 households at the following census of 2011. The 2016 census measured the population of the rural district as 6,667 in 1,990 households. The most populous of its seven villages was Fesenduz (now in Fesenduz Rural District), with 2,461 people.

In 2021, the district was separated from the county in the establishment of Chaharborj County and renamed the Central District. The rural district was transferred to the new Firuzabad District.

=== Other villages in the rural district ===
- Eslamabad
- Kord Kandi
