= Marhemetabad-e Shomali Rural District =

Rural district in West Azerbaijan province, Iran

Marhemetabad-e Shomali Rural District Persian: دهستان مرحمت‌آباد شمالی
- Rural District
- Location within Iran
- Coordinates: 37°07′N 45°59′E
- Country: Iran
- Province: West Azerbaijan
- County: Chaharborj
- District: Central
- Established: 1987
- Capital: Shabanlu

Population (2016)
  - Total: 10,146
- Time zone: UTC+3:30 (IRST)

Marhemetabad-e Shomali Rural District (Persian: دهستان مرحمت‌آباد شمالی) is in the Central District (Note: Formerly Marhemetabad District of Miandoab County) of Chaharborj County, West Azerbaijan province, Iran. Its capital is the village of Shabanlu. The previous capital of the rural district was the village of Chahar Borj-e Qadim, now the city of Chahar Borj.

== Demographics ==
=== Population ===
At the time of the 2006 National Census, the rural district's population (as a part of Marhemetabad District (Note: Renamed the Central District of Chaharborj County) in Miandoab County) was 9,021 in 2,255 households. There were 10,294 inhabitants in 2,803 households at the following census of 2011. The 2016 census measured the population of the rural district as 10,146 in 3,014 households. The most populous of its 21 villages was Qepchaq (now in Qepchaq Rural District), with 3,669 people.

In 2021, the district was separated from the county in the establishment of Chaharborj County and renamed the Central District.

=== Other villages in the rural district ===
- Khazineh Anbar-e Jadid
- Khazineh Anbar-e Qadim
- Uzun Owbeh
