= Theodor Siebs =

German linguist (1862–1941)

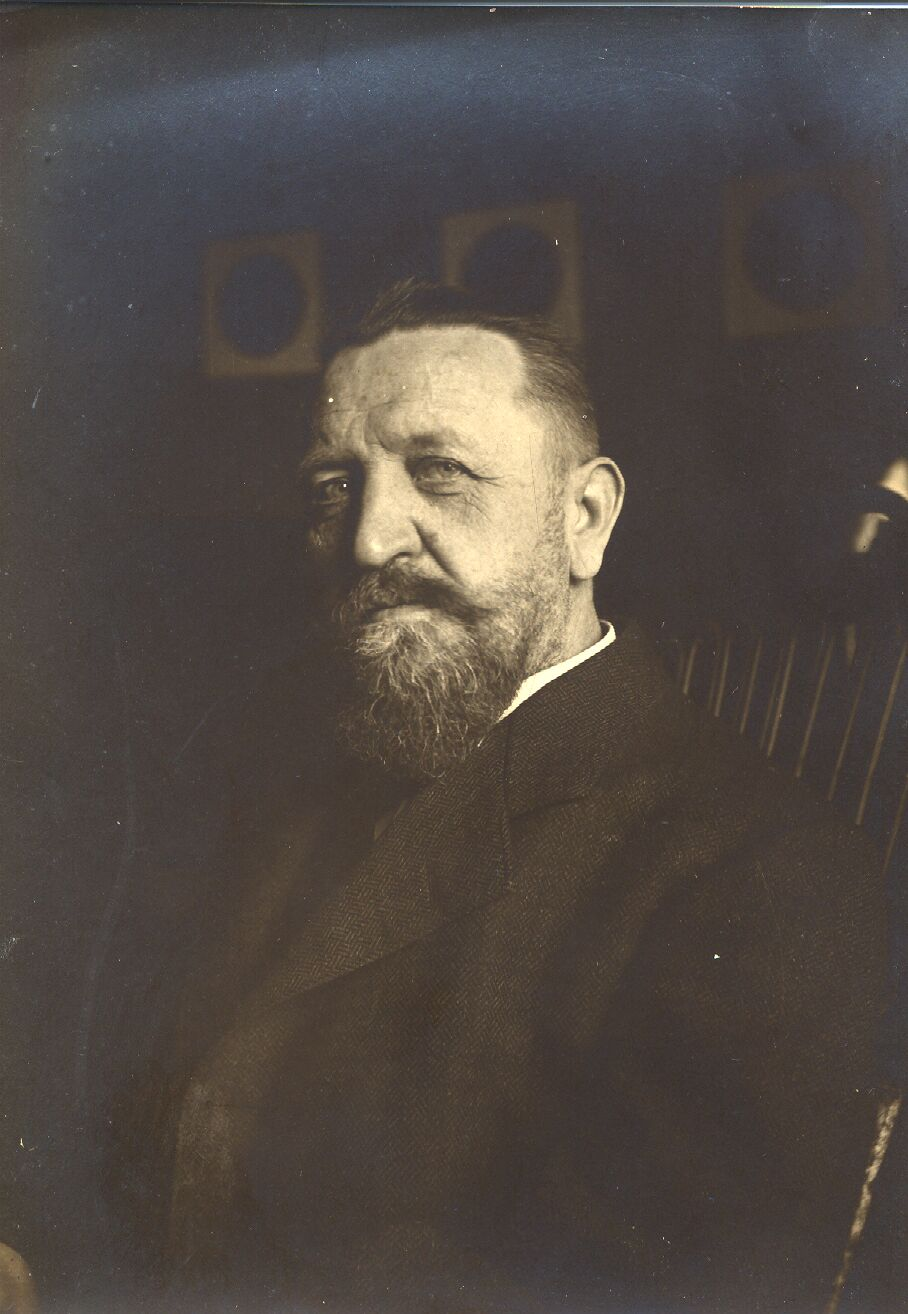
- Siebs in 1922
- Born: 26 August 1862; Free City of Bremen
- Died: 28 May 1941 (aged 78); Breslau, Germany (now Wrocław, Poland)
- Education: University of Tübingen
- Scientific career
- Fields: Linguistics, philology
- Workplaces: University of Greifswald; University of Breslau

Theodor Siebs (German pronunciation: [ˈteːodoːɐ̯ ˈziːps]; 26 August 1862 – 28 May 1941) was a German linguist most remembered today as the author of Deutsche Bühnenaussprache ('German stage pronunciation'), published in 1898. The work was largely responsible for setting the standard pronunciation of the modern German language and is referred to popularly by German speakers as der Siebs ('the Siebs').

Siebs was born in the Free City of Bremen on 26 August 1862. He studied linguistics and classical philology in Tübingen and later was a professor both at the University of Greifswald and the University of Breslau. His writings on language and languages are varied, but there is an emphasis on the history and state of Frisian languages. His Deutsche Bühnenaussprache is still relevant, though for practical purposes it has largely been supplanted by other works (see references) that employ the IPA notation (International Phonetic Alphabet), which Siebs' work did not, and which adapted to the actual pronunciation of speakers attempting a standard pronunciation.

Siebs died on 28 May 1941 in Breslau, Germany (now Wrocław, Poland).

== See also ==
- Old Frisian
- Siebs's law
- Wangerooge Frisian
