= Firuzabad District (Chaharborj County) =

District in West Azerbaijan province, Iran

Firuzabad District Persian: بخش فیروزآباد
- District
- Location within Iran
- Coordinates: 37°08′00″N 45°51′34″E
- Country: Iran
- Province: West Azerbaijan
- County: Chaharborj
- Capital: Firuzabad
- Time zone: UTC+3:30 (IRST)

Firuzabad District (Persian: بخش فیروزآباد) is in Chaharborj County, West Azerbaijan province, Iran. Its capital is the village of Firuzabad, whose population at the time of the 2016 National Census was 1,704 people in 508 households.

== History ==
In 2021, Marhemetabad District (Note: Renamed the Central District of Chaharborj County) was separated from Miandoab County in the establishment of Chaharborj County and renamed the Central District. The new county was divided into two districts of two rural districts each, with Chahar Borj (Note: Formerly the village of Chahar Borj-e Qadim) as its capital and only city at the time.

== Demographics ==
=== Administrative divisions ===
Firuzabad District
Administrative Divisions
Fesenduz RD
Marhemetabad-e Miyani RD
RD = Rural District
