= Chaharborj County =

County in West Azerbaijan province, Iran

Chaharborj County Persian: شهرستان چهاربرج
- County
- Location of Chaharborj County in West Azerbaijan province (center right, purple)

- Location of West Azerbaijan province in Iran
- Coordinates: 37°08′N 45°54′E
- Country: Iran
- Province: West Azerbaijan
- Established: 2021
- Capital: Chahar Borj
- Districts: Central, Firuzabad
- Time zone: UTC+3:30 (IRST)

Chaharborj County (Persian: شهرستان چهاربرج) is in West Azerbaijan province, Iran. Its capital is the city of Chahar Borj, (Note: Formerly the village of Chahar Borj-e Qadim) whose population at the time of the 2016 National Census was 9,406 in 2,793 households.

== History ==
In 2021, Marhemetabad District (Note: Renamed the Central District of Chaharborj County) was separated from Miandoab County in the establishment of Chaharborj County and renamed the Central District. The new county was divided into two districts of two rural districts each, with Chahar Borj as its capital and only city at the time.

== Demographics ==
=== Administrative divisions ===
Chaharborj County's administrative structure is shown in the following table.

Chaharborj County
Administrative Divisions
Central District (Note: Formerly Marhemetabad District of Miandoab County)
Marhemetabad-e Shomali RD
Qepchaq RD
Chahar Borj (city)
Firuzabad District
Fesenduz RD
Marhemetabad-e Miyani RD
RD = Rural District

== See also ==
Media related to Chaharborj County at Wikimedia Commons
