= Central District (Chaharborj County) =

District in West Azerbaijan province, Iran

Central District (Chaharborj County) Persian: بخش مرکزی شهرستان چهاربرج
- District
- Location within Iran
- Coordinates: 37°08′N 45°57′E
- Country: Iran
- Province: West Azerbaijan
- County: Chaharborj
- Established: Established
- Founder: 1990
- Capital: Chahar Borj

Population (2016)
  - Total: 26,219 (Note: As Marhemetabad District of Miandoab County)
- Time zone: UTC+3:30 (IRST)

The Central District of Chaharborj County (Persian: بخش مرکزی شهرستان چهاربرج) (Note: Formerly Marhemetabad District (بخش مرحمت‌آباد) of Miandoab County) is in West Azerbaijan province, Iran. Its capital is the city of Chahar Borj. (Note: Formerly the village of Chahar Borj-e Qadim)

== History ==
In 2021, Marhemetabad District (Note: Renamed the Central District of Chaharborj County) was separated from Miandoab County in the establishment of Chaharborj County and renamed the Central District. The new county was divided into two districts of two rural districts each, with Chahar Borj as its capital and only city at the time.

== Demographics ==
=== Population ===
At the time of the 2006 National Census, the district's population (as Marhemetabad District of Miandoab County) was 23,700 in 5,718 households. The following census in 2011 counted 25,814 people in 7,135 households. The 2016 census measured the population of the district as 26,219 inhabitants in 7,797 households.

=== Administrative divisions ===
Central District (Chaharborj County) (Note: As Marhemetabad District of Miandoab County at the 2006, 2011, and 2016 censuses)
Administrative Divisions	2006	2011	2016
Marhemetabad-e Miyani RD (Note: Transferred to Firuzabad District after the 2016 census)	6,739	6,839	6,667
Marhemetabad-e Shomali RD	9,021	10,294	10,146
Qepchaq RD (Note: Established after the 2016 census)			
Chahar Borj (city)	7,940	8,681	9,406
Total	23,700	25,814	26,219
RD = Rural District
