= Cape Flats English =

English mostly spoken in Cape Flats and Cape Town

- Region: Cape Town
- Language family: Indo-European: Germanic; West Germanic; North Sea Germanic; Anglo-Frisian; Anglic; English; South African English; Cape Flats English
- Writing system: Latin (English alphabet)

Language codes
- ISO 639-3: –
- Glottolog: cape1242

Cape Flats English (abbreviated CFE) or Coloured English is the variety of South African English spoken mostly in the Cape Flats area of Cape Town. Its speakers most often refer to it as "broken English", which probably reflects a perception that it is simply inadequately-learned English, but, according to Karen Malan, it is a distinct, legitimate dialect of English.

Cape Flats English is very close to the Broad (or "Extreme") variety of White South African English. Wood (1987) argues that the Respectable−Extreme (or "Cultivated−Broad") dichotomy can also be set up for CFE itself, with the former being used by the middle class (whose L1 tends to be CFE) and the latter being used by the working class (whose L1 tends to be the Cape Vernacular variety of Afrikaans).

== Grammar ==
- Double negatives occur in the context of a co-occurring indefinite, as in "I didn't catch nothing".
- Calques from Afrikaans may occur, such as "I took that towel and I made me closed" (Afrikaans: (...) myself toegemaak; standard English: (...) wrapped myself).

== Phonetics and phonology ==
=== Consonants ===
The accent is typically non-rhotic, but exceptions occur, especially for Afrikaans loanwords.

=== Vowels ===
==== Monophthongs ====
- KIT is split into two different allophones, similar to most other White South African English varieties. However, like Broad and Afrikaner accents, Cape Flats speakers across the social scale shift both allophones to a more open and centralised position:
  - The standard allophone is realised as a centralised [ɪ̈], which is otherwise [ɪ] in White varieties. This is only realised in stressed syllables within the following environments: adjacent to velar consonants, after /h/, word-initially and usually before /ʃ/.
  - In all other environments, it is pronounced as a schwa [ə] instead. This contrasts with other White varieties, where it is [ɪ̈], similar to Cape Flats' standard [ɪ̈]. Like other White accents, the vowel becomes retracted before /l/, which is realised [ɤ⁽ᵊ⁾~ɔ] in this variety.
- FLEECE is typically long [iː] when stressed and short [i] when unstressed. Note before /l/ it is mainly long [iː] with a tendency to experience vowel breaking ([i(ː)ə~i(ː)ʊ]).
  - However, it may be lengthened [iˑ~iː] word finally (HAPPY) though the short realisation is also possible.
- FOOT is characteristically back and rounded [u], even more so for second-language speakers. Sometimes it can be centred to [ʉ] or opened to [ɤ].
- GOOSE is long and back [uː], an "old-fashioned" realisation compared to a more fronted [ʉː] found in other White South African accents. However, some first language speakers may approximate this value. It is short [u] in unstressed environments, indistinguishable from the FOOT vowel.
- LOT is typically [ɔ~ɒ] and occasionally [ɒ(ː)ᵊ], with first-language mainly realising it as [ɒ].
- THOUGHT is [oː⁽ᵊ⁾] across the board, with [ɔ] often found in the broadest of speakers.
- The NORTH–FORCE merger is present, where the vowel fluctuates between [oː~ɔ] with [ɔ] being typical of the broadest speakers. [oːə] and [ɒ] are also recorded as occasional alternatives. The short forms are typically found in unstressed environments.
- STRUT is generally [a~ɐ], where [ɐ] is more common and sometimes [ʌ] in first-language speakers. Before /l/, the vowel is typically lowered to [ɒ].
- NURSE has a high degree of variability where Wood (1987) notes mainly an open mid-central [ɜː] with some instances of [ə(ː)], and a backed [oː] before /l/. However Finn (2004) shows a more fronted and close [øː(ə)] with some instances of [ɐː], [ɒːə] and [ə].
- DRESS is typically raised to [e], but with some tendency of lowering it to [ɛ]. An allophonic variant of [æ ~ ɛ] is also observed before /l/.
- TRAP vowel is shifted to [ɛ] similar Broad and Afrikaner varieties, though [æ⁽ᵊ⁾] can also occur, especially before /l/.
  - The accent has the TRAP–BATH split, where the BATH vowel varies between [a(ːə)~ɒ(ː)(ə)]. However, Wood (1987, p. 137) notes that in words where BATH is found before nasals in RP, such as dance or example, may have an "American-style" [æː(ə)] especially in the broadest varieties, distinct from TRAP by vowel length. A similar phenomenon can be found in Australian English outside of Adelaide.
- START, similar to the PALM vowel, is [ɑː], with Finn (2004) citing [aːə] and a less typical [aːᶟ] as possible alternatives.
- LETTER has typical realisations of [ə], [ɜ], [ɐ]. A rhotic realisation [əɾ] is also recorded in Wood (1987) by some second-language speakers.
- COMMA is [ə] with a word-final allophone [ɐ]. Backed allophones, including [ɵ], [ɔ] and [o], occur before /l/. In the suffix -es, it is typically [ə].

==== Diphthongs ====
- NEAR and SQUARE show varying levels of diphthongisation. NEAR is usually [iɐ] but with [iɜ] and [iə] also being recorded, where SQUARE can be [eːᵊ] but more likely [eː]. Wood (1987) primarily notes monophthongal values across the social scale, with [iː, ɛː, əː, eː, ɜː] and [ɛː] respectively.
- CHOICE is typically [ɔi~oi].
- CURE varies between diphthongal [əu] and monophthongal [oː~ɔː] with the monophthongal form, found in all speakers, is most realised word-finally.
- FACE is typically [ei] for native speakers and more open [ɛi] for learners. The vowel is often backed and lowered [əi], [ɐi], [ʌi]. In hiatus environments, an offglide [j] is added; an influence from Afrikaans, e.g. layer [ˈɫeijɐˑ].
- GOAT exhibits an extremely high degree of variation, with [ɐu~ʌu] being the typical realisations for all speakers.. Finn (2004) also records [əu, ɔu, ɒu] and less commonly [ou, au] as variants. The vowel offset is often weakened ([ɔᶷ~oᶷ]) before /l/ (which is usually [ɒˑ]) and in unstressed positions. Similar to FACE, an offglide [w] is realised in hiatus positions, e.g. going [ˈɡɐuwiŋ].
- PRICE has a high degree of variability, with two main sets of realisations present:
- MOUTH exhibits Canadian-raising-style variation, with non-low realisations [ɐu, æu, ʌu~əu] before voiced consonants and raised [au] elsewhere. An offglide [w] is found in hiatus positions, e.g. power.

=== Phonemic incidence ===
- The word asthma is pronounced /ˈæʃmə/ instead of standard /ˈæs(θ)mə/.
- The first vowel of the name Cecil is recorded with the KIT vowel (= [ə]) instead of the usual FLEECE.
- Likewise, skip uses reduced [ə] instead of expected the [ɪ̈] despite being adjacent to a velar consonant (/k/).
- In (-)one and once, [ɒ] can also be heard alongside [ɐ] among first-language speakers. Second-language speakers always pronounce it as [a].
- Similarly want and non- are pronounced with STRUT, instead of the standard LOT.
- The DRESS vowel can be realised as [ə(ː)] in certain contexts, especially in the injection yes.

== Bibliography ==
- Finn, Peter (2004), "Cape Flats English: phonology", in Schneider, Edgar W.; Burridge, Kate; Kortmann, Bernd; Mesthrie, Rajend; Upton, Clive (eds.), A handbook of varieties of English, vol. 1: Phonology, Mouton de Gruyter, pp. 964–984, ISBN 3-11-017532-0
- Malan, Karen (1996), "Cape Flats English", in De Klerk, Vivian (ed.), Focus on South Africa, John Benjamins Publishing, pp. 125–148, ISBN 90-272-4873-7
- Wood, Tahir M. (1987), Perceptions of, and attitudes towards varieties of English in the Cape Peninsula, with particular reference to the "Coloured Community" (PDF), Grahamstown: Rhodes University
