= Close back rounded vowel =

Vowel sound represented by ⟨u⟩ in IPA

u
- IPA number: 308

Audio sample
- source · help

Encoding
- Entity (decimal): &#117;
- Unicode (hex): U+0075
- X-SAMPA: u
- Braille: ⠥ (braille pattern dots-136)
Image

IPA: Vowels

	Front	Central	Back
Close	i y	ɨ ʉ	ɯ u
Near-close	ɪ ʏ		ʊ
Close-mid	e ø	ɘ ɵ	ɤ o
Mid	e̞ ø̞	ə	ɤ̞ o̞
Open-mid	ɛ œ	ɜ ɞ	ʌ ɔ
Near-open	æ	ɐ
Open	a ɶ	ä	ɑ ɒ

- IPA help
- audio
- full chart
- template

Legend: unrounded • rounded

The close back rounded vowel, or high back rounded vowel, is a type of vowel sound used in many spoken languages. The symbol in the International Phonetic Alphabet that represents this sound is ⟨u⟩.

In most languages, this rounded vowel is pronounced with protruded lips ('endolabial'). However, in a few cases the lips are compressed ('exolabial').

[u] alternates with labio-velar approximant [w] in certain languages, such as French, and in the diphthongs of some languages, [u̯] with the non-syllabic diacritic and [w] are used in different transcription systems to represent the same sound.

== Close back protruded vowel ==
The close back protruded vowel is the most common variant of the close back rounded vowel. It is typically transcribed in IPA simply as ⟨u⟩ (the convention used in this article). As there is no dedicated IPA diacritic for protrusion, the symbol for the close back rounded vowel with an old diacritic for labialization, ⟨ ̫⟩, can be used as an ad hoc symbol ⟨u̫⟩. Another possible transcription is ⟨uʷ⟩ or ⟨ɯʷ⟩ (a close back vowel modified by endolabialization), but that could be misread as a diphthong.

=== Features ===
- Its vowel height is close, also known as high, which means the tongue is positioned close to the roof of the mouth without creating a constriction that would be classified as a consonant.
- Its vowel backness is back, which means the tongue is positioned back in the mouth without creating a constriction that would be classified as a consonant.
- Its place of articulation is velar, which means it is articulated with the back of the tongue (the dorsum) at the soft palate.
- Its roundedness is protruded, which means that the corners of the lips are drawn together, and the inner surfaces exposed.

Sagittal section of a vocal tract pronouncing ⟨u⟩. Note that a wavy glottis in this diagram indicates a voiced sound.

=== Occurrence ===
Language		Word	IPA	Meaning	Notes
Afrikaans	Standard	boek	[bu̜k]	'book'	Only weakly rounded. See Afrikaans phonology
Arabic	Standard	جنوب / ǧanuub	[d͡ʒaˈnuːb]	'south'	See Arabic phonology
Armenian	Eastern	դուռ / dur	[dur]	'door'	
Bengali		তবু	[t̪obu]	'still'	See Bengali phonology
Bavarian	Amstetten dialect	und	[und̥]	'and'	Contrasts close [u], near-close [o̝], close-mid [o] and open-mid [ɔ] back rounded vowels in addition to the open central unrounded [ä].
Bulgarian		луд / lud	[ɫut̪]	'crazy'	See Bulgarian phonology
Catalan		suc	[ˈs̺uk]	'juice'	See Catalan phonology
Chinese	Mandarin	土 / tǔ	[tʰu˨˩˦]	'earth'	See Standard Chinese phonology
Chinese	Cantonese	夫 / fū	[fuː˥]	'man'	See Cantonese phonology
Chinese	Shanghainese	瓜 / ku	[ku˩]	'melon'	Height varies between close and close-mid; contrasts with a close to close-mid back compressed vowel.
Chuvash		урам	[uˈram]	'street'	
Danish	Standard	du	[tu]	'you'	See Danish phonology
Dutch	Standard	voet	[vut]	'foot'	Somewhat fronted in Belgian Standard Dutch.
English	Australian	book	[buk]	'book'	Corresponds to [ʊ] in other accents. See Australian English phonology
English	Cape Flats	book	[buk]	'book'	May be advanced to [ʉ], or lowered and unrounded to [ɤ]. See South African English phonology
English	Cultivated South African	boot	[bu̟ut]	'boot'	Typically more front [ʉu] than cardinal [uw]. See White South African English phonology and American English phonology.
English	General American	boot	[bu̟ut]	'boot'	Typically more front [ʉu] than cardinal [uw]. See White South African English phonology and American English phonology.
English	Geordie	boot	[bu̟ut]	'boot'	May be central [ʉː] instead.
English	Irish	boot	[bu̟ut]	'boot'	Realized as central [ʉː] in Ulster.
English	Some Multicultural London speakers	boot	[bu̟ut]	'boot'	More commonly front [yː].
English	Conservative Received Pronunciation	boot	[bu̟ut]	'boot'	Realized as central [ʉ] in Standard Southern British.
English	Welsh	boot	[bu̟ut]	'boot'	
English	Pakistani	boot	[buːʈ]	'boot'	
English	Greater New York City	boot	[buːt]	'boot'	
English	New Zealand	treacle	[ˈtɹ̝̊iːku]	'treacle'	Possible realization of the unstressed vowel /ɯ/, which is variable in rounding and ranges from central to (more often) back and close to close-mid. Corresponds to /əl/ in other accents. See New Zealand English phonology
Estonian		sule	[ˈsule̞]	'feather' (gen. sg.)	See Estonian phonology
Finnish		kukka	[ˈkukːɑ]	'flower'	See Finnish phonology
Faroese		gulur	[ˈkuːlʊɹ]	'yellow'	See Faroese phonology
French		où	[u]	'where'	See French phonology
Georgian		გუდა / guda	[ɡudɑ]	'leather bag'	
German	Standard	Fuß	[fuːs]	'foot'	See Standard German phonology
German	Many speakers	Stunde	[ˈʃtundə]	'hour'	The usual realization of /ʊ/ in Switzerland, Austria and partially also in Western and Southwestern Germany (Palatinate, Swabia). See Standard German phonology
Greek	Modern Standard	που / pou	[pu]	'where'	See Modern Greek phonology
Hindustani	Hindi	ख़ून(khoon)	[xuːn]	'blood'	See Hindustani phonology.
Hindustani	Urdu	خون(khoon)	[xuːn]	'blood'	See Hindustani phonology.
Hungarian		út	[uːt̪]	'way'	See Hungarian phonology
Icelandic		þú	[θ̠u]	'you'	See Icelandic phonology
Indonesian	Standard	unta	[unta]	'camel'	See Indonesian phonology
Italian		tutto	[ˈt̪ut̪t̪o]	'all', 'everything'	See Italian phonology
Kaingang		[ˈndukːi]		'in the belly'	
Kazakh		туған / tuğan	[t̪ʰuˈʁɑ̝̃n̪]	'native'	Transcribed phonemically as ⟨ʊw⟩.
Khmer		ភូមិ / phumĭ	[pʰuːm]	'village'	See Khmer phonology
Korean		눈 / nun	[nuːn]	'snow'	See Korean phonology
Kurdish	Kurmanji (Northern)	çû	[tʃʰuː]	'wood'	See Kurdish phonology
Kurdish	Sorani (Central)	چوو / çû	[tʃʰuː]	'wood'	See Kurdish phonology
Kurdish	Palewani (Southern)	چوو / çû	[tʃʰuː]	'wood'	See Kurdish phonology
Latin	Classical	sus	[suːs]	'pig'	
Limburgish		sjoen	[ʃu̟n]	'beautiful'	Back or near-back, depending on the dialect. The example word is from the Maastrichtian dialect.
Lower Sorbian		zub	[z̪up]	'tooth'	
Luxembourgish		Luucht	[luːχt]	'air'	See Luxembourgish phonology
Malay		ubat	[u.bät]	'medicine'	See Malay phonology
Malayalam		ഉപ്പ്	upːɨ̆	'salt'	See Malayalam phonology
Mongolian		үүр / üür	[uːɾɘ̆]	'nest'	
Mpade		kusumu	[kusumu]	'mouse'	
Nogai		сув	[suː]	'water'	
Persian		دور / dur	[duɾ]	'far'	See Persian phonology
Polish		buk	[buk]	'beech tree'	Also represented orthographically by ⟨ó⟩. See Polish phonology
Portuguese		tu	[ˈtu]	'you'	See Portuguese phonology
Romanian		unu	[ˈun̪u]	'one'	See Romanian phonology
Russian		узкий / uzkiy / uzkij	[ˈus̪kʲɪj]	'narrow'	See Russian phonology
Scottish Gaelic		ùbhlan	[ˈuːl̪ˠən]	'apples'	Normal realisation of /uː/ in most dialects. In Lewis and Wester Ross as an allophone in proximity to broad sonorants; /uː/ elsewhere fronted to [ʉː] or [yː].
Serbo-Croatian		дуга / duga	[d̪ǔːɡä]	'rainbow'	See Serbo-Croatian phonology
Shiwiar					
Spanish		curable	[kuˈɾäβ̞le̞]	'curable'	See Spanish phonology
Sotho		tumo	[tʼumɔ]	'fame'	Contrasts close, near-close and close-mid back rounded vowels. See Sotho phonology
Swahili		ubongo	[ubongo]	'brain'	
Tagalog		utang	[ˈʔutɐŋ]	'debt'	
Thai	Standard	ชลบุรี / chonburi	[tɕ͡ʰōn.bū.rīː]	'Chonburi'	
Turkish		uzak	[uˈz̪äk]	'far'	See Turkish phonology
Udmurt		урэтэ / urėtė	[urete]	'to divide'	
Ukrainian		рух / rukh	[rux]	'motion'	See Ukrainian phonology
Upper Sorbian		žuk	[ʒuk]	'beetle'	
Urdu		دُور / dur	[d̪uːɾ]	'far'	See Urdu phonology
Welsh		mwg	[muːɡ]	'smoke'	See Welsh phonology
West Frisian		jûn	[juːn]	'evening, tonight'	See West Frisian phonology
Yoruba		itọju	[itɔju]		
Zapotec	Tilquiapan	gdu	[ɡdu]	'all'	

== Close back compressed vowel ==
Close back compressed vowel

u᫦

ɯᵝ

Some languages, such as Japanese and Swedish, have a close back vowel that has a distinct type of rounding, called compressed or exolabial. Only Shanghainese is known to contrast it with the more typical protruded (endolabial) close back vowel, but the height of both vowels varies from close to close-mid.

Compression of the lips can be shown with the letter ⟨β̞⟩ as ⟨ɯ͡β̞⟩ (simultaneous [ɯ] and labial compression) or ⟨ɯᵝ⟩ ([ɯ] modified with labial compression), though that can suggest that the vowel is a diphthong (as indeed it is in Swedish).

=== Features ===
- Its vowel height is close, also known as high, which means the tongue is positioned close to the roof of the mouth without creating a constriction that would be classified as a consonant.
- Its vowel backness is back, which means the tongue is positioned back in the mouth without creating a constriction that would be classified as a consonant.
- Its place of articulation is velar, which means it is articulated with the back of the tongue (the dorsum) at the soft palate.
- Its roundedness is compressed, which means that the margins of the lips are tense and drawn together in such a way that the inner surfaces are not exposed.

=== Occurrence ===
Language		Word	IPA	Meaning	Notes
Chinese	Shanghainese	都/tub	[tɯᵝ˩]	'capital'	Height varies between close and close-mid; contrasts with a close to close-mid back protruded vowel.
Japanese		空気 / kūki	[kɯ̟ᵝːki]	'air'	Near-back; may be realized as central [ɨᵝ] by younger speakers. See Japanese phonology
Lizu		[mɯ̟ᵝ˥˧]		'feather'	Near-back; following bilabial and alveolar stops, it is realized as a syllabic trill [ʙ̩].
Norwegian		mot	[mɯᵝːt]	'courage'	The example word is from Urban East Norwegian, in which the vowel can be diphthongized to [ɯᵝə̯]. See Norwegian phonology
Swedish	Central Standard	oro	[ɯᵝːrɯᵝː]	'unease'	Often realized as a sequence [ɯᵝβ̞] or [ɯᵝβ]. See Swedish phonology

== See also ==
- Index of phonetics articles
- Close central compressed vowel
- Close front protruded vowel

== Citations ==
Place →	Labial					Coronal										Dorsal					Laryngeal			
Manner ↓	Bilabial		Labiodental		Linguolabial		Dental		Alveolar		Postalveolar		Retroflex		(Alveolo-)palatal		Velar		Uvular		Pharyngeal/epiglottal		Glottal	
Nasal	m̥	m	ɱ̊	ɱ		n̼	n̪̊	n̪	n̥	n	n̠̊	n̠	ɳ̊	ɳ	ɲ̊	ɲ	ŋ̊	ŋ	ɴ̥	ɴ				
Plosive	p	b	p̪	b̪	t̼	d̼	t̪	d̪	t	d			ʈ	ɖ	c	ɟ	k	ɡ	q	ɢ	ʡ		ʔ	
Sibilant affricate							t̪s̪	d̪z̪	ts	dz	t̠ʃ	d̠ʒ	tʂ	dʐ	tɕ	dʑ								
Non-sibilant affricate	pɸ	bβ	p̪f	b̪v			t̪θ	d̪ð	tɹ̝̊	dɹ̝	t̠ɹ̠̊˔	d̠ɹ̠˔			cç	ɟʝ	kx	ɡɣ	qχ	ɢʁ	ʡʜ	ʡʢ	ʔh	
Sibilant fricative							s̪	z̪	s	z	ʃ	ʒ	ʂ	ʐ	ɕ	ʑ								
Non-sibilant fricative	ɸ	β	f	v	θ̼	ð̼	θ	ð	θ̠	ð̠	ɹ̠̊˔	ɹ̠˔	ɻ̊˔	ɻ˔	ç	ʝ	x	ɣ	χ	ʁ	ħ	ʕ	h	ɦ
Approximant		β̞		ʋ				ð̞		ɹ		ɹ̠		ɻ		j		ɰ						˷
Tap/flap		ⱱ̟		ⱱ					ɾ̥	ɾ			ɽ̊	ɽ						ɢ̆		ʡ̆		
Trill	ʙ̥	ʙ							r̥	r		r̠	ɽ̊r̥	ɽr					ʀ̥	ʀ	ʜ	ʢ		
Lateral affricate									tɬ	dɮ			tꞎ	d𝼅	c𝼆	ɟʎ̝	k𝼄	ɡʟ̝						
Lateral fricative							ɬ̪		ɬ	ɮ			ꞎ	𝼅	𝼆	ʎ̝	𝼄	ʟ̝						
Lateral approximant								l̪	l̥	l		l̠	ɭ̊	ɭ	ʎ̥	ʎ	ʟ̥	ʟ		ʟ̠				
Lateral tap/flap									ɺ̥	ɺ			𝼈̊	𝼈		ʎ̆		ʟ̆						

		BL	LD	D	A	PA	RF	P	V	U
Implosive	Voiced	ɓ			ɗ		ᶑ	ʄ	ɠ	ʛ
Implosive	Voiceless	ɓ̥			ɗ̥		ᶑ̊	ʄ̊	ɠ̊	ʛ̥
Ejective	Stop	pʼ			tʼ		ʈʼ	cʼ	kʼ	qʼ
Ejective	Affricate		p̪fʼ	t̪θʼ	tsʼ	t̠ʃʼ	tʂʼ	tɕʼ	kxʼ	qχʼ
Ejective	Fricative	ɸʼ	fʼ	θʼ	sʼ	ʃʼ	ʂʼ	ɕʼ	xʼ	χʼ
Ejective	Lateral affricate				tɬʼ			c𝼆ʼ	k𝼄ʼ	q𝼄ʼ
Ejective	Lateral fricative				ɬʼ					
Click (top: velar; bottom: uvular)	Tenuis	kʘ qʘ		kǀ qǀ	kǃ qǃ		k𝼊 q𝼊	kǂ qǂ		
Click (top: velar; bottom: uvular)	Voiced	ɡʘ ɢʘ		ɡǀ ɢǀ	ɡǃ ɢǃ		ɡ𝼊 ɢ𝼊	ɡǂ ɢǂ		
Click (top: velar; bottom: uvular)	Nasal	ŋʘ ɴʘ		ŋǀ ɴǀ	ŋǃ ɴǃ		ŋ𝼊 ɴ𝼊	ŋǂ ɴǂ	ʞ	
Click (top: velar; bottom: uvular)	Tenuis lateral				kǁ qǁ					
Click (top: velar; bottom: uvular)	Voiced lateral				ɡǁ ɢǁ					
Click (top: velar; bottom: uvular)	Nasal lateral				ŋǁ ɴǁ					
