= Close-mid back unrounded vowel =

Vowel sound represented by ⟨ɤ⟩ in IPA

ɤ
- IPA number: 315

Audio sample
- source · help

Encoding
- Entity (decimal): &#612;
- Unicode (hex): U+0264
- X-SAMPA: 7
- Braille: ⠲ (braille pattern dots-256) ⠕ (braille pattern dots-135)
Image

IPA: Vowels

	Front	Central	Back
Close	i y	ɨ ʉ	ɯ u
Near-close	ɪ ʏ		ʊ
Close-mid	e ø	ɘ ɵ	ɤ o
Mid	e̞ ø̞	ə	ɤ̞ o̞
Open-mid	ɛ œ	ɜ ɞ	ʌ ɔ
Near-open	æ	ɐ
Open	a ɶ	ä	ɑ ɒ

- IPA help
- audio
- full chart
- template

Legend: unrounded • rounded

The close-mid back unrounded vowel, or high-mid back unrounded vowel, is a type of vowel sound, used in some spoken languages. Its symbol in the International Phonetic Alphabet is ⟨ɤ⟩, called "ram's horn." This symbol is distinct from the symbol for the voiced velar fricative ⟨ɣ⟩, which has a descender, but some texts still use a ram's horn for the voiced velar fricative.

Before the 1989 IPA Convention, the symbol for the close-mid back unrounded vowel was ⟨⟩, sometimes called "baby gamma", which has a flat top; this symbol was in turn derived from and replaced the inverted small capital A ⟨⟩, that represented the sound before the 1928 revision to the IPA. The symbol was again revised to be ⟨⟩, "ram's horn", with a rounded top, in order to better differentiate it from the Latin gamma ⟨ɣ⟩.

Unicode provides U+0264 ɤ LATIN SMALL LETTER RAMS HORN, but in some fonts this character may appear as a "baby gamma" instead. The superscript IPA version is U+10791 𐞑 MODIFIER LETTER SMALL RAMS HORN. As of Unicode 16.0, there exists a capital ram's horn at U+A7CB Ɤ LATIN CAPITAL LETTER RAMS HORN ⟨⟩.

== Features ==
- Its vowel height is close-mid, also known as high-mid, which means the tongue is positioned halfway between a close vowel (a high vowel) and a mid vowel.
- Its vowel backness is back, which means the tongue is positioned back in the mouth without creating a constriction that would be classified as a consonant. Unrounded back vowels tend to be centralized, which means that often they are in fact near-back.
- Its place of articulation is velar, which means it is articulated with the back of the tongue (the dorsum) at the soft palate.
- It is unrounded, which means that the lips are not rounded.

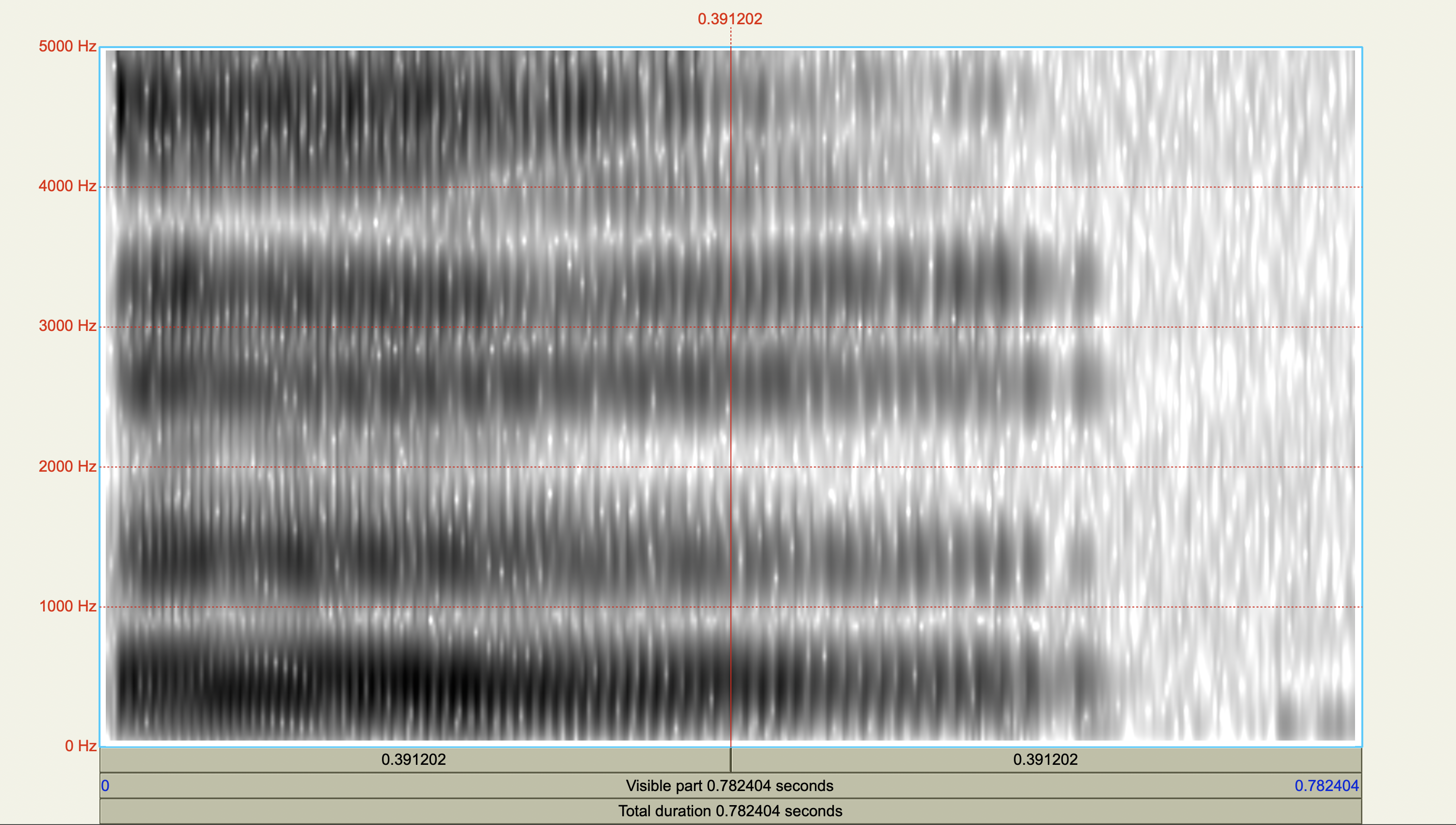
Spectrogram of [ɤ]

== Occurrence ==
Language		Word	IPA	Meaning	Notes
Aklanon		saeamat	[saɤamat]	'thanks'	
Bashkir		туғыҙ/tuğıź	[tuˈʁɤð]	'nine'	
Biak		ores	[ɤres]	'stand'	
Bulgarian		бъз/bǎz	[bɤs]	'elderflower'	
Chinese	Mandarin	餓/è	[ɤ˥˩]	'hungry'	
English	Cape Flats	foot	[fɤt]	'foot'	Possible realization of /ʊ/; may be [u] or [ʉ] instead. See South African English phonology
English	South African	foot	[fɤt]	'foot'	Possible realization of /ʊ/; may be a weakly rounded [ʊ] instead. See South African English phonology
English	Geordie	foot	[fɤt]	'foot'	Usual realization of /ʊ/. See Geordie phonology
English	Birmingham and The Black Country	foot	[fɤt]	'foot'	Corresponds to /ʊ/ in most other dialects.
Estonian		kõrv	[kɤrv]	'ear'	Can be close-mid central [ɘ] or close back [ɯ] instead, depending on the speaker. See Estonian phonology
Gayo		kule	[kuˈlɤː]	'tiger'	Close-mid or mid; one of the possible allophones of /ə/.
Iaai		löö	[lɤː]	'banana leaf'	
Irish	Ulster	Uladh	[ɤl̪ˠu]	'Ulster'	See Irish phonology
Kaingang		mo	[ˈᵐbɤ]	'tail'	Varies between back [ɤ] and central [ɘ]
Korean	Gyeongsang dialect	거기/geogi	[ˈkɤ̘ɡɪ]	'there'	See Korean phonology
Marathi		मत/mata	[mɤːt̪]	'opinion'	See Marathi phonology
Northern Tiwa	Taos dialect	mânpəumán	[ˌmã̀ˑˈpɤ̄u̯mã̄]	'it was squeezed'	May be central [ɘ] instead. See Taos phonology
Samogitian		õlgs	[ˈɤːl̪ˠgs]	'long'	May be central [ɘ] instead.
Scottish Gaelic		doirbh	[t̪ɤɾʲɤv]	'difficult'	See Scottish Gaelic phonology
Sundanese	Priangan	ᮌᮩᮜᮤᮞ᮪/geulis	[gɤˈlis]	'pretty'	
Rusyn	Lemko variety	часы/časy	[t͡ɕaˈsɤ]	'times'	Used only in place of etymological praslavic sound *y
Rusyn	Prešov variety	часы/časy	[t͡ɕaˈsɤ]	'times'	Used only in place of etymological praslavic sound *y
Rusyn	Subcarpathian variety	часы/časy	[t͡ɕaˈsɤ]	'times'	Used only in place of etymological praslavic sound *y
Thai		เธอ/thơ̄	[tʰɤ̄ː]	'you'	
Tuvan		ыт/yt	[ɤt̚]	'dog'	
Yaqay		khoro	[xɤrɤ]	'frog'	Uncommon pronunciation of /o/.

== See also ==
- Index of phonetics articles

== Notes ==
Place →	Labial					Coronal										Dorsal					Laryngeal			
Manner ↓	Bilabial		Labiodental		Linguolabial		Dental		Alveolar		Postalveolar		Retroflex		(Alveolo-)palatal		Velar		Uvular		Pharyngeal/epiglottal		Glottal	
Nasal	m̥	m	ɱ̊	ɱ		n̼	n̪̊	n̪	n̥	n	n̠̊	n̠	ɳ̊	ɳ	ɲ̊	ɲ	ŋ̊	ŋ	ɴ̥	ɴ				
Plosive	p	b	p̪	b̪	t̼	d̼	t̪	d̪	t	d			ʈ	ɖ	c	ɟ	k	ɡ	q	ɢ	ʡ		ʔ	
Sibilant affricate							t̪s̪	d̪z̪	ts	dz	t̠ʃ	d̠ʒ	tʂ	dʐ	tɕ	dʑ								
Non-sibilant affricate	pɸ	bβ	p̪f	b̪v			t̪θ	d̪ð	tɹ̝̊	dɹ̝	t̠ɹ̠̊˔	d̠ɹ̠˔			cç	ɟʝ	kx	ɡɣ	qχ	ɢʁ	ʡʜ	ʡʢ	ʔh	
Sibilant fricative							s̪	z̪	s	z	ʃ	ʒ	ʂ	ʐ	ɕ	ʑ								
Non-sibilant fricative	ɸ	β	f	v	θ̼	ð̼	θ	ð	θ̠	ð̠	ɹ̠̊˔	ɹ̠˔	ɻ̊˔	ɻ˔	ç	ʝ	x	ɣ	χ	ʁ	ħ	ʕ	h	ɦ
Approximant		β̞		ʋ				ð̞		ɹ		ɹ̠		ɻ		j		ɰ						˷
Tap/flap		ⱱ̟		ⱱ					ɾ̥	ɾ			ɽ̊	ɽ						ɢ̆		ʡ̆		
Trill	ʙ̥	ʙ							r̥	r		r̠	ɽ̊r̥	ɽr					ʀ̥	ʀ	ʜ	ʢ		
Lateral affricate									tɬ	dɮ			tꞎ	d𝼅	c𝼆	ɟʎ̝	k𝼄	ɡʟ̝						
Lateral fricative							ɬ̪		ɬ	ɮ			ꞎ	𝼅	𝼆	ʎ̝	𝼄	ʟ̝						
Lateral approximant								l̪	l̥	l		l̠	ɭ̊	ɭ	ʎ̥	ʎ	ʟ̥	ʟ		ʟ̠				
Lateral tap/flap									ɺ̥	ɺ			𝼈̊	𝼈		ʎ̆		ʟ̆						

		BL	LD	D	A	PA	RF	P	V	U
Implosive	Voiced	ɓ			ɗ		ᶑ	ʄ	ɠ	ʛ
Implosive	Voiceless	ɓ̥			ɗ̥		ᶑ̊	ʄ̊	ɠ̊	ʛ̥
Ejective	Stop	pʼ			tʼ		ʈʼ	cʼ	kʼ	qʼ
Ejective	Affricate		p̪fʼ	t̪θʼ	tsʼ	t̠ʃʼ	tʂʼ	tɕʼ	kxʼ	qχʼ
Ejective	Fricative	ɸʼ	fʼ	θʼ	sʼ	ʃʼ	ʂʼ	ɕʼ	xʼ	χʼ
Ejective	Lateral affricate				tɬʼ			c𝼆ʼ	k𝼄ʼ	q𝼄ʼ
Ejective	Lateral fricative				ɬʼ					
Click (top: velar; bottom: uvular)	Tenuis	kʘ qʘ		kǀ qǀ	kǃ qǃ		k𝼊 q𝼊	kǂ qǂ		
Click (top: velar; bottom: uvular)	Voiced	ɡʘ ɢʘ		ɡǀ ɢǀ	ɡǃ ɢǃ		ɡ𝼊 ɢ𝼊	ɡǂ ɢǂ		
Click (top: velar; bottom: uvular)	Nasal	ŋʘ ɴʘ		ŋǀ ɴǀ	ŋǃ ɴǃ		ŋ𝼊 ɴ𝼊	ŋǂ ɴǂ	ʞ	
Click (top: velar; bottom: uvular)	Tenuis lateral				kǁ qǁ					
Click (top: velar; bottom: uvular)	Voiced lateral				ɡǁ ɢǁ					
Click (top: velar; bottom: uvular)	Nasal lateral				ŋǁ ɴǁ					
