= Australian English phonology =

Sound system of Australian English

Speech example
An example of a man with a general Australian accent.

Speech example
An example of a woman from South Australia with a broad accent (Julia Gillard).

Speech example
An example of a man from Queensland with a cultivated accent (Geoffrey Rush).

Australian English (AuE) accents are the non-rhotic pronunciations of English used by most native-born Australians. Phonologically, Australian English is a relatively regionally homogeneous variety of the English language. Australian English is notable for vowel length contrasts which are absent from some other English dialects.

== Vowels ==
Australian English vowels
	Front		Central		Back	
	short	long	short	long	short	long
Close	ɪ				ʊ	oː
Mid	e	eː	ə	ɜː	ɔ	
Open	æ	(æː)	ɐ	ɐː		
Diphthongs	ɪə æɪ ɑe oɪ iː æɔ əʉ ʉː					

The vowels of Australian English can be divided according to length. The long vowels, which include monophthongs and diphthongs, mostly correspond to the tense vowels used in analyses of Received Pronunciation (RP) as well as its centring diphthongs. The short vowels, consisting only of monophthongs, correspond to the RP lax vowels. There exist pairs of long and short vowels with overlapping vowel quality giving Australian English phonemic length distinction.

There are two families of phonemic transcriptions of Australian English: revised ones that attempt to more accurately represent the phonetic sounds of Australian English and the Mitchell-Delbridge system, which is minimally distinct from Jones' original transcription for RP. This page uses a revised transcription system from Harrington, Cox, and Fletcher (HCE), but at times it additionally provides the Mitchell-Delbridge equivalents as the latter system is commonly used for example in the Macquarie Dictionary and much of the literature.

=== Monophthongs ===
Stressed monophthongs of the general variety on a vowel chart, from Cox & Fletcher (2017:65).

Stressed monophthongs of the broad variety on a vowel chart, reconstructed from Harrington, Cox & Evans (1997)

The Australian English vowels /ɪ/ in KIT, /e/ in DRESS and /eː/ in SQUARE are noticeably closer (pronounced with a higher tongue position) than their Standard Southern British equivalents. However, a recent short-front-vowel chain shift has resulted in younger generations having lower positions than this for these three vowels.

- The target for /ɪ/ is closer to cardinal [i] than in other dialects. The phrase fish and chips as pronounced by an Australian (/fɪʃ ən tʃɪps/) can sound a lot like feesh and cheeps to speakers of New Zealand English and other English dialects around the world. Similarly, words such as bit and sit may sound to others like beat and seat, respectively.
- The sound /ɪə/ in NEAR is usually pronounced as a diphthong (or disyllabically [iːə], like CURE) only in open syllables. In closed syllables, it is distinguished from /ɪ/ primarily by length and from /iː/ by the significant onset in the latter.
- /e/ tends to be higher than the corresponding vowel in General American or RP. The typical realization is close-mid [e], although for some speakers it may be even closer [e̝] (according to John Wells, this pronunciation can occur only in Broad varieties). A recent change is the lowering of /e/ to the [ɛ] region.
- For some Victorian speakers, /e/ has merged with the /æ/ of TRAP in pre-lateral environments, and thus the words celery and salary are homophonous as /ˈsæləɹiː/. See salary-celery merger.
- As with New Zealand English, the PALM/START vowel in words like park /pɐːk/, calm /kɐːm/ and farm /fɐːm/ is central (in the past even front /aː/) in terms of tongue position and non-rhotic. This vowel is only distinguished from the STRUT vowel by length, thus: park /pɐːk/ versus puck /pɐk/.
- The sound /æː/ is traditionally transcribed and analysed the same as the short /æ/ in TRAP, but minimal pairs exist in at least some Australians' speech. The longer vowel is found in the adjectives bad, mad, glad and sad, before the /ɡ/ sound (for example, hag, rag, bag) and also in content words before /m/ and /n/ in the same syllable (for example, ham, tan, plant). In South Australia, plant is usually pronounced with the vowel sound /ɐː/, as in rather and father. In some speakers, especially those with the broad accent, /æː/ and /æ/ will be shifted toward [ɛː] and [ɛ], respectively.
- There is /æ/ tensing before a nasal consonant. The nasal sounds create changes in preceding vowels because air can flow into the nose during the vowel. Nasal consonants can also affect the articulation of a vowel. Thus, for many speakers, the /æː/ vowel in words like jam, man, dam and hand is shifted towards [eː]. This is also present in General American and Cockney English. Length has become the main difference between words like 'ban' and 'Ben', with 'ban' pronounced [beːn] and 'Ben' pronounced [ben].
- /æ/ is pronounced as open front [a] by many younger speakers.
- The phoneme /ɜː/ of NURSE may be pronounced at least as high as [ɘː], and has a lowered F3 that might indicate that it is rounded [ɵː]. The ⟨ɜ⟩ glyph is used — rather than ⟨ɘ⟩ or ⟨ɵ⟩ — as most revisions of the phonemic orthography for Australian English predate the 1993 modifications to the International Phonetic Alphabet. At the time, ⟨ɜ⟩ was suitable for any mid central vowel, rounded or unrounded.
- The schwa /ə/ is a highly variable sound. For this reason, it is not shown on the vowel charts to the right. The word-final schwa in comma and letter is often lowered to [ɐ] so that it strongly resembles the STRUT vowel /ɐ/: [ˈkɔmɐ, ˈleɾɐ]. As the latter is a checked vowel (meaning that it cannot occur in a final stressed position) and the lowering of /ə/ is not categorical (meaning that those words can be also pronounced [ˈsəʉfə] and [ˈbeɾə], whereas strut is never pronounced [stɹət]), this sound is considered to belong to the /ə/ phoneme. The word-initial schwa (as in enduring /ənˈdʒʉːɹɪŋ/) is typically mid [ə]: [ənˈdʒʉːɹɪŋ]. In the word-internal position (as in bottom /ˈbɔtəm/), /ə/ is raised to [ɨ̞]: [ˈbɔɾɨ̞m], as in American English roses [ˈɹoʊzɨ̞z]. Thus, the difference between the /ə/ of paddock and the /ɪ/ of panic lies in the backness of the vowels, rather than their height: [ˈpædɨ̞k, ˈpænik]. In the rest of the article, those allophones of /ə/ are all transcribed with the broad symbol ⟨ə⟩: [ˈkɔmə] etc. /ɪ/ is also broadly transcribed with ⟨ɪ⟩: [ˈpænɪk], which does not capture its closeness.
- As with General American, the weak vowel merger is nearly complete in Australian English: unstressed /ɪ/ is merged with /ə/ (schwa) except before a following velar. New Zealand English takes it a step further and merges all instances of /ɪ/ with /ə/ (even in stressed syllables), which is why the New Zealand pronunciation of the dish name fish and chips as /ˈfəʃ ən ˈtʃəps/ sounds like 'fush and chups' to Australians. In Australian English, /ə/ is restricted to unstressed syllables, as in most dialects.
- The trap-bath split is a regional variable in Australia, with phonemic incidence of the PALM vowel /ɐː/ being more widespread (appearing in a larger number of words) in South Australia than elsewhere in the country. This is due to the fact that that state was settled later than the rest of Australia, when the lengthened pronunciation was already a feature of London speech. Research done by Crystal (1995) shows that the word graph is pronounced with the PALM vowel (/ɡɹɐːf/) by 86% speakers from Adelaide, whereas 100% speakers from Hobart use the TRAP vowel in this word: /ɡɹæf/. There are words in which the TRAP vowel is much less common; for instance, Crystal reports that both the word grasp and the verb to contrast are most commonly pronounced with the PALM vowel: /ɡɹɐːsp/, /kənˈtɹɐːst/. This also affects the pronunciation of some placenames; Castlemaine is locally /ˈkæsəlmæɪn/, but speakers from outside of Victoria often pronounce that name /ˈkɐːsəlmæɪn/ by analogy to the noun castle in their local accent.

=== Diphthongs ===
Fronting diphthongs of the general variety shown on a vowel chart, from Cox & Fletcher (2017:67)

Fronting diphthongs of the broad variety shown on a vowel chart, reconstructed from Harrington, Cox & Evans (1997)

Other diphthongs of the general variety shown on a vowel chart, from Cox & Fletcher (2017:67)

Other diphthongs of the broad variety shown on a vowel chart, reconstructed from Harrington, Cox & Evans (1997). /ɪə/ is shown here as a long monophthong.

Variation in Australian closing diphthongs
Phoneme	Lexical set	Phonetic realization		
Phoneme	Lexical set	Cultivated	General	Broad
/iː/	FLEECE	[ɪi]	[ɪ̈i]	[əːɪ]
/ʉː/	GOOSE	[ʊu]	[ɪ̈ɯ, ʊʉ]	[əːʉ]
/æɪ/	FACE	[ɛɪ]	[æ̠ɪ]	[æ̠ːɪ, a̠ːɪ]
/əʉ/	GOAT	[ö̞ʊ]	[æ̠ʉ]	[æ̠ːʉ, a̠ːʉ]
/ɑe/	PRICE	[a̠e]	[ɒe]	[ɒːe]
/æɔ/	MOUTH	[a̠ʊ]	[æo]	[ɛːo, ɛ̃ːɤ]

- The vowel /iː/ of FLEECE has an onset [ɪi̯], except before laterals. The onset is often lowered to [əi], so that beat is [bəit] for some speakers.
- As in General American and Standard Southern British, the final vowel in words like happy and city is pronounced as /iː/ (happee, citee), not as /ɪ/ (happy-tensing).
- In some parts of Australia, a fully backed allophone of /ʉː/ in GOOSE, transcribed [ʊː], is common before /l/. As a result, the pairs full/fool and pull/pool differ phonetically only in vowel length for those speakers. The usual allophone is further forward in New South Wales than Victoria. It is moving further forwards, however, in both regions at a similar rate.
- The second elements of /æɪ/ and /oɪ/ (FACE and CHOICE) on the one hand and /ɑe/ (PRICE) on the other are somewhat different. The first two approach the KIT vowel /ɪ/, whereas the ending point of /ɑe/ is more similar to the DRESS vowel [e]. John Wells writes this phoneme /ɑɪ/, with the same ending point as /æɪ/ and /oɪ/ (which he writes with ⟨ʌɪ⟩ and ⟨ɔɪ⟩). However, the second element of /ɑe/ is not nearly as different from that of the other fronting-closing diphthongs as the ending point of /æɔ/ is from that of /əʉ/, which is the reason why it could be transcribed narrowly as [ɑɪ].
- The first element of /ɑe/ may be raised and rounded in broad accents.
- The first element of /æɪ/ is significantly lower [a̠ɪ] than in many other dialects of English.
- There is significant allophonic variation in the /əʉ/ of GOAT, including a backed allophone [ɔʊ] before a word-final or preconsonantal /l/. The first part of this allophone is in the same position as /ɔ/, but [ɔʊ] differs from it in that it possesses an additional closing glide, which also makes it longer than /ɔ/.
- /əʉ/ is shifted to [ɔy] among some speakers. This realisation has its roots in South Australia but is becoming more common among younger speakers across the country.
- The phoneme /ʊə/ of CURE is rare and almost extinct. Most speakers consistently use [ʉːə] or [ʉː] (before /ɹ/) instead. Many cases of RP /ʊə/ are pronounced instead with the /oː/ phoneme in Australian English. Pour and poor, more and moor and shore and sure are homophones, but "tore" and "tour" remain distinct.

=== Examples of vowels ===
HCE	Example words	Mitchell- Delbridge	OED
/ɐ/	strut, bud, hud; cup	ʌ	ʌ
/ɐː/	bath, palm, start, bard, hard; father	a	ʌː
/ɑe/	price, bite, hide	aɪ	ɑe
/æ/	trap, lad, had	æ	æ
/æː/	bad, tan	æ	æ
/æɪ/	face, bait, hade	eɪ	æe
/æɔ/	mouth, bowed, how'd	aʊ	æɔ
/e/	dress, bed, head	ɛ	e
/eː/	square, bared, haired	ɛə	eə
/ɜː/	nurse, bird, heard	ɜ	ɜː
/ə/	about, winter; alpha	ə	ə
/əʉ/	goat, bode, hoed	oʊ	oʊ
/ɪ/	kit, bid, hid	ɪ	ɪ
/ɪə/	near, beard, hear; here	ɪə	ɪə
/iː/	fleece, bead, heat	i	iː
/iː/	happy	i	i
/oː/	thought, north, sure, board, hoard, poor; hawk, force	ɔ	ɔː
/oɪ/	choice, boy; voice	ɔɪ	oɪ
/ɔ/	lot, cloth, body, hot	ɒ	ɔ
/ʉː/	goose, boo, who'd	u	uː
/ʊ/	foot, hood	ʊ	ʊ

- The first column, HCE, is the vowels first outlined in Harrington, Cox and Evans (1997) and fully presented in Cox & Fletcher (2017). (It differs somewhat from the ad hoc Wiktionary transcription.)
- The symbol /ɔ/ can be easy to misinterpret. It represents different vowels: the LOT vowel in the HCE system (transcribed /ɒ/ in the Mitchell-Delbridge system), but the THOUGHT vowel in the Mitchell-Delbridge system (transcribed /oː/ in HCE).
- The fourth column is the Oxford English Dictionary transcription, provided for comparison, taken from the OED website. In a few instances the OED example word differs from the others given in this table; these are appended at the end of the second column following a semicolon.

== Consonants ==
Australian English consonants are similar to those of other non-rhotic varieties of English. A table containing the consonant phonemes is given below.

Australian English consonant phonemes
		Labial	Dental	Alveolar	Post- alveolar	Palatal	Velar	Glottal
Nasal		m		n			ŋ	
Plosive	fortis	p		t			k	
Plosive	lenis	b		d			ɡ	
Affricate	fortis				tʃ			
Affricate	lenis				dʒ			
Fricative	fortis	f	θ	s	ʃ			h
Fricative	lenis	v	ð	z	ʒ			
Approximant				l	ɹ	j	w	

Non-rhoticity

- Australian English is mostly non-rhotic; in other words, the /ɹ/ sound does not appear at the end of a syllable or immediately before a consonant. So the words butter [ˈbɐɾə], here [hɪə] and park [pɐːk] will not contain the /ɹ/ sound.

Linking and intrusive [ɹ]

- The [ɹ] sound can occur when a word that has a final ⟨r⟩ in the spelling comes before another word that starts with a vowel. For example, in car alarm the sound [ɹ] can occur in car because here it comes before another word beginning with a vowel. The words far, far more and farm do not contain an [ɹ] but far out will contain the linking [ɹ] sound because the next word starts with a vowel sound.
- An intrusive [ɹ] may be inserted before a vowel in words that do not have ⟨r⟩ in the spelling. For example, drawing will sound like draw-ring, saw it will sound like sore it, the tuner is and the tuna is will both be [ðə ˈtʃʉːnə.ɹɪz]. This [ɹ] occurs between /ə/, /oː/ and /ɐː/ and the following vowel regardless of the historical presence or absence of [ɹ]. Between /eː/, /ɜː/ and /ɪə/ (and /ʉːə/ whenever it stems from the earlier /ʊə/) and the following vowel, the [ɹ]-ful pronunciation is the historical one.

Flapping

- Intervocalic /t/ (and for some speakers /d/) undergo voicing and flapping to the alveolar tap [ɾ] or occasionally to the alveolar trill [r] after the stressed syllable and before unstressed vowels (as in butter, party) and syllabic /l/ or /n/ (bottle [ˈbɔrl̩], button [ˈbɐɾn̩]), as well as at the end of a word or morpheme before any vowel (what else [wɔr‿ˈels], whatever [wɔɾˈevə]). For those speakers where /d/ also undergoes the change, there will be homophony, for example, metal and medal or petal and pedal will sound the same ([ˈmeɾl̩] and [ˈpeɾl̩], respectively). In formal speech /t/ is retained. [t] in the cluster [nt] can elide. As a result, in quick speech, words like winner and winter can become homophonous (as [ˈwɪnə]). This is a quality that Australian English shares with New Zealand and North American English.

T-glottalisation

- Some speakers use a glottal stop [ʔ] as an allophone of /t/ in final position, for example trait, habit; or in medial position, such as a /t/ followed by a syllabic /n/ is often realized as a glottal stop, for example button [ˈbɐʔn̩] or fatten [ˈfæʔn̩]. Alveolar pronunciations nevertheless predominate.

Pronunciation of /l/

- The alveolar lateral approximant /l/ is velarised [ɫ] in pre-pausal and preconsonantal positions and often also in morpheme-final positions before a vowel. There have been some suggestions that onset /l/ is also velarised, although that needs to be further researched. Some speakers vocalise preconsonantal, syllable-final and syllabic instances of /l/ to a close back vowel similar to /ʊ/, so that milk can be pronounced [mɪʊ̯k] and noodle [ˈnʉːdʊ]. This is more common in South Australia than elsewhere.

Yod-dropping and coalescence

- Standard Australian English usually coalesces /tj/ and /dj/ into /tʃ/ and /dʒ/ respectively. Because of this palatalisation, dune is pronounced as /dʒʉːn/, exactly like June, and the first syllable of Tuesday /ˈtʃʉːzdæɪ/ is pronounced like choose /tʃʉːz/. That said, there is stylistic and social variation in this feature. /t/ and /d/ in the clusters /tɹ/ and /dɹ/ are similarly affricated.
- Word initial /sj/ and /zj/ have merged with /s/ and /z/ respectively. Other cases of /sj/ and /zj/ are often pronounced respectively [ʃ] and [ʒ], as in assume /əˈʃʉːm/ and resume /rəˈʒʉːm/ (ashume and rezhume).
- Similarly, /lj/ has merged with /l/ word initially. Remaining cases of /lj/ are often pronounced simply as [j] in colloquial speech.
- /nj/ and other common sequences of consonant plus /j/, are retained.
- For some speakers, /ʃ/ (or "sh") may be uttered instead of /s/ before the stressed /tj/ sound in words like student, history, eschew, street and Australia – As a result, in quick speech, eschew will sound like esh-chew. According to author Wayne P. Lawrence, "this phonemic change seems to be neither dialectal nor regional", as it can also be found among some American, Canadian, British and New Zealand English speakers as well.

== Other features ==
- Between voiced sounds, the glottal fricative /h/ may be realised as voiced [ɦ], so that e.g. behind may be pronounced as either [bəˈhɑend] or [bəˈɦɑend].
- The sequence /hj/ is realised as a voiceless palatal fricative [ç], so that e.g. huge is pronounced [çʉːdʒ].
- The word foyer is usually pronounced /ˈfoɪə/, as in NZ and American English, rather than /ˈfoɪeɪ/ as in British English.
- The word data is commonly pronounced /ˈdɐːtə/, with /ˈdæɪtə/ being the second most common, and /ˈdætə/ being very rare.
- The trans- prefix is pronounced with /æ/, even in South Australia, where the trap–bath split is significantly more advanced than in other states.
- Some dialects of Australian English feature a fricated /t/ in certain contexts, such as in words like beautiful and great.
- In English, upward inflexion (a rise in the pitch of the voice at the end of an utterance) typically signals a question. Some Australian English speakers commonly use a form of upward inflexion in their speech that is not associated with asking questions. Some speakers use upward inflexion as a way of including their conversational partner in the dialogue. This is also common in Californian English.

== Relationship to other varieties ==
Australian English pronunciation is most similar to that of New Zealand English; many people from other parts of the world often cannot distinguish them but there are differences. New Zealand English has centralised /ɪ/ and the other short front vowels are higher. New Zealand English more strongly maintains the diphthongal quality of the NEAR and SQUARE vowels and they can be merged as something around [iə]. New Zealand English, like Victoria, has merged /e/ with /æ/ in pre-lateral environments.

Both New Zealand English and Australian English are also similar to South African English, so they have even been grouped together under the common label "Southern Hemisphere Englishes". Like the other two varieties in that group, Australian English pronunciation bears some similarities to dialects from the South-East of Britain; Thus, it is non-rhotic and has the trap-bath split although, as indicated above, this split was not completed in Australia as it was in England, so many words that have the PALM vowel in Southeastern England retain the TRAP vowel in Australia.

Historically, the Australian English speaking manuals endorsed the lengthening of /ɔ/ before unvoiced fricatives however this has since been reversed. Australian English lacks some innovations in Cockney since the settling of Australia, such as the use of a glottal stop in many places where a /t/ would be found, th-fronting, and h-dropping

== AusTalk ==
AusTalk is a database of Australian speech from all regions of the country. Initially, 1000 adult voices were planned to be recorded in the period between June 2011 and June 2016. By the end of it, voices of 861 speakers with ages ranging from 18 to 83 were recorded into the database, each lasting approximately an hour. The database is expected to be expanded in future, to include children's voices and more variations. As well as providing a resource for cultural studies, the database is expected to help improve speech-based technology, such as speech recognition systems and hearing aids.

The AusTalk database was collected as part of the Big Australian Speech Corpus (Big ASC) project, a collaboration between Australian universities and the speech technology experts.

== See also ==
- Variation in Australian English
- New Zealand English phonology
- White South African English phonology
- Regional accents of English

== Bibliography ==
- Blake, B. J. (1985), "'Short a' in Melbourne English", Journal of the International Phonetic Association, 15: 6–20, doi:10.1017/S0025100300002899, S2CID 145558284
- Cox, Felicity (2006), "The acoustic characteristics of /hVd/ vowels in the speech of some Australian teenagers", Australian Journal of Linguistics, 26 (2): 147–179, doi:10.1080/07268600600885494, S2CID 62226994
- Cox, Felicity; Fletcher, Janet (2017) [First published 2012], Australian English Pronunciation and Transcription (2nd ed.), Cambridge University Press, ISBN 978-1-316-63926-9
- Cox, Felicity; Palethorpe, Sallyanne (2003), "The border effect: Vowel differences across the NSW–Victorian Border", Proceedings of the 2003 Conference of the Australian Linguistic Society: 1–14
- Cox, Felicity; Palethorpe, Sallyanne (2007), "Australian English" (PDF), Journal of the International Phonetic Association, 37 (3): 341–350, doi:10.1017/S0025100307003192
- Crystal, D. (1995), Cambridge Encyclopedia of the English Language, Cambridge University Press
- Durie, M.; Hajek, J (1994), "A revised standard phonemic orthography for Australian English vowels", Australian Journal of Linguistics, 14: 93–107, doi:10.1080/07268609408599503.
- Harrington, J.; Cox, Felicity; Evans, Z. (1997), "An acoustic phonetic study of broad, general, and cultivated Australian English vowels", Australian Journal of Linguistics, 17 (2): 155–84, doi:10.1080/07268609708599550
- Palethorpe, S. and Cox, F. M. (2003) Vowel Modification in Pre-lateral Environments. Poster presented at the International Seminar on Speech Production, December 2003, Sydney.
- Tollfree, Laura (2001), "Variation and change in Australian consonants: reduction of /t/", in Blair, David; Collins, Peter (eds.), English in Australia, John Benjamins, pp. 45–67, doi:10.1075/veaw.g26.06tol, ISBN 90-272-4884-2
- Wells, John C. (1982), Accents of English, Vol. 1: An Introduction (pp. i–xx, 1–278), Vol. 3: Beyond the British Isles (pp. i–xx, 467–674), Cambridge University Press, doi:10.1017/CBO9780511611766, ISBN 0-52129719-2, 0-52128541-0
