= White South African English phonology =

Phonological system

Speech example.
An example of a male second-language speaker showcasing South African slang and regionalisms.

Some of the slang is excessive, and it is as if the example is trying to include as much slang as possible.

The speaker is also mixing in many words from Afrikaans, another official language of South Africa. This is relatively common among bilingual people who speak both languages, but the example uses this mixing in excess.

This mix of English and Afrikaans is used by many South Africans, but predominantly amongst the Caucasian population.

This article covers the phonological system of South African English (SAE) as spoken primarily by White South Africans. While there is some variation among speakers, SAE typically has a number of features in common with English as it is spoken in southern England (in places like London), such as non-rhoticity and the TRAP–BATH split.

The two main phonological features that mark South African English as distinct are the behaviour of the vowels in KIT and PALM. The KIT vowel tends to be "split" so that there is a clear allophonic variation between the front [ɪ] and central [ɨ̞] or [ə]. The PALM vowel is characteristically back in the General and Broad varieties of SAE. The tendency to monophthongise /ɑʊ/ and /aɪ/ to [ɐː] and [aː], respectively, is also a typical feature of General and Broad White South African English.

General South African English features phonemic vowel length (so that ferry /ˈferiː/ and fairy /ˈfeːriː/ and possibly cot /kɒt/ and cart /kɑːt/ differ only in length) as well as phonemic roundedness, so that fairy /ˈfeːriː/ is distinguished from furry /ˈføːriː/ by roundedness.

Features involving consonants include the tendency for /tj/ (as in tune) and /dj/ (as in dune) to be realised as [tʃ] and [dʒ], respectively (see Yod coalescence), and /h/ has a strong tendency to be voiced initially.

== Vowels ==
The vocalic phonemes of South African English are as follows:

	Front			Central			Back	
	unrounded		rounded	unrounded	rounded		Back	
	short	long	long	short	short	long	short	long
Close	(ɪ)	iː		ɨ	ʊ	ʉː		
Mid	e	eː	øː	ə			(ʌ), (o)	oː
Open	ɛ			(a)			ɒ	ɑː
Diphthongs	eɪ aɪ ɔɪ ɑʊ œʊ ɪə ʊə							

== KIT, COMMA, STRUT and PAP ==
RP features three phonemes /ɪ/, /ə/ and /ʌ/ which contrast in unstressed closed syllables, so that Lenin /ˈlenɪn/ and except /ɪkˈsept/ are distinct from Lennon /ˈlenən/ and accept /əkˈsept/, whereas rabbit /ˈræbɪt/ does not rhyme with abbot /ˈæbət/ and cucumber /ˈkjuːkʌmbə/ has a different second vowel from industry /ˈɪndəstri/.

In stressed closed syllables, only /ɪ/ and /ʌ/ appear. This is also true of Cultivated SAE, but the contrast between /ɪ/ and /ə/ is not always maintained. In General and Broad, it is invariably lost, yielding a high schwa [ɨ̞] (hereafter transcribed without the diacritic). This renders Lenin homophonous with Lennon as /ˈlenɨn/, except with accept as /ɨkˈsept/ and makes rabbit /ˈrɛbɨt/ rhyme with abbot /ˈɛbɨt/.

This [ɨ] quality is also used in most cases in stressed syllables (so in all three syllables of limited [ˈlɨmɨtɨd]), except when in contact with velars and palatals, after /h/ as well as in the stressed word-initial position, where the conservative [ɪ] quality (further fronted to [i] in Broad) is retained. In Broad, [ɨ] may be lowered to [ə]. In General, it can happen only in unstressed syllables, so that scented and centered can both be pronounced [ˈsentəd], rather than [ˈsentɨd].

This phonetic detail is not reflected in transcriptions in this article, except in the word-final position where the vowel is transcribed with ⟨ə⟩. The STRUT vowel is truly contrastive only in the Conservative variety, where there is a clear distinction between /ɪ/ and /ə/. Because of the merger of those two in General and Broad, STRUT may be considered a mere stressed mid schwa [ə], which, according to Lass, is a common and perhaps pivotal value in General SAE spoken in Cape Town.

He transcribes this vowel with ⟨ɜ⟩, which is defined as an additional mid central vowel on the 1989 IPA vowel chart. In this article, the symbol ⟨ə⟩ is used instead. STRUT is a highly variable vowel, which varies from a centralized [ʌ̈] (mostly in word-list style) to an open central [ä]. The PAP vowel /a/, a non-native open central vowel that appears mostly in loanwords from Afrikaans overlaps with the openest allophones of STRUT. For speakers that have [ä] as a norm for STRUT, PAP is not a distinct class.

== Other vowels ==
- The bracketed /a/ and /o/ appear only in loanwords (such as pap /pap/ 'weak' or gogga /ˈxoxa/ 'insect'), mainly from Afrikaans (in IPA transcriptions of Afrikaans, the latter is often transcribed with ⟨ɔ⟩ despite its height). In addition, Afrikaans [iə] and [uə] (traditionally transcribed with ⟨eː⟩ and ⟨oː⟩) are typically nativized as NEAR and CURE, that is /ɪə/ (as in steen /stɪən/ 'chenin blanc') and /ʊə/ (as in kloof /klʊəf/ 'deep glen'). As a result, /ɪə/ and /ʊə/ occur much more frequently in South African English than in other varieties. On the recording above, the first three vowels can be heard in many words (although no loanword with /ʊə/ occurs).
- The original short front vowels TRAP, DRESS and KIT underwent a vowel shift similar to that found in New Zealand English:
  - The TRAP vowel /ɛ/ varies from [æ] to [ɛ] in General and Cultivated SAE. However, the new prestige value in younger Johannesburg speakers of the General variety (particularly those who live in the wealthy northern suburbs) seems to be open front [a], the same as in Standard Southern British. Before [ɫ], the fully open [a] is the norm in the General variety, whereas before voiced stops as well as bilabial and alveolar nasals the vowel tends to be centralised and lengthened to [æ̈ː], often with slight diphthongisation ([æ̈ːə]). Broad /ɛ/ can be as close as mid [ɛ̝], encroaching on the Cultivated realisation of DRESS.
  - DRESS /e/ is close-mid [e] or higher [e̝] in General, often with centralisation [ë ~ ɪ] (it is unclear whether the last allophone is distinct from the front allophone of KIT in the General variety). Variants above the close-mid height are typical of female speech. General /e/ is similar enough to /ɪ/ in RP and similar accents as to cause perceptual problems for outsiders. Broad variants are very similar to the General ones, but in Cultivated the vowel can be as open as [e̞] (within the RP norm). In General and Broad, the vowel can be lowered to [ɛ] or even [æ] when it occurs before [ɫ].
  - KIT is described above.
- The FLEECE vowel /iː/ is a long close front monophthong [iː], either close to cardinal [iː] or slightly mid-centralised. It does not have a tendency to diphthongise, which distinguishes SAE from Australian and New Zealand English.
- The FOOT vowel /ʊ/ is typically a weakly rounded retracted central vowel [ɵ̠], somewhat more central than the traditional RP value. Younger speakers of the General variety (especially females) often use a fully central [ɵ]. This vowel is effectively the rounded counterpart of KIT. Backer and sometimes more rounded variants ([ʊ ~ ʊ̹]) occur before [ɫ]. Broad SAE can feature a more rounded vowel, but that is more common in Afrikaans English.
- The GOOSE vowel /ʉː/ is usually central [ʉː] or somewhat fronter in White varieties, though in the Cultivated variety, it is closer to [uː] (typically not fully back, thus [u̟ː]), which is also the normal realisation before [ɫ] in other varieties. Younger (particularly female) speakers of the General variety use an even more front vowel [yː], so that food [fyːd] may be distinguished from feed [fiːd] only by rounding. The vowel is often a monophthong, but there is some tendency to diphthongise it before sonorants (as in wounded [ˈwʉundɨd] and school [skʉuɫ]).
- In the General variety, PRICE /aɪ/, MOUTH /ɑʊ/ and GOAT /œʊ/ are commonly monophthongized to [äː], [ɐ̠ː] (phonetically between BATH and a monophthongal PRICE) and [œː]. Among those, the monophthongal variant of PRICE is the most common. The last monophthong contrasts with the close-mid [øː], which stands for NURSE. The monophthonging of GOAT can cause intelligibility problems for outsiders; Roger Lass says that he himself once misunderstood the phrase the total onslaught [ðə ˈtœːtl̩ ˈɒnsloːt] for the turtle onslaught [ðə ˈtøːtl̩ ˈɒnsloːt]. On the other hand, CHOICE does not monophthongize. In addition, /eɪ/ is almost monophthongal [ee̝], resulting in a near-merger of FACE with SQUARE, which is normally a close-mid monophthong [eː].

=== Transcriptions ===
Sources differ in the way they transcribe South African English. The differences are listed below. The traditional phonemic orthography for the Received Pronunciation as well as the reformed phonemic orthographies for Australian and New Zealand English have been added for the sake of comparison.

Transcription systems
South African English						Australian	New Zealand	RP	Example words
This article	Wells 1982	Lass 1984	Lass 1990	Branford 1994	Rogers 2014	Australian	New Zealand	RP	Example words
iː	iː	iː	iː	—N/a	i	iː	iː	iː	fleece
iː	i	—N/a	iː	—N/a	ɪ	iː	iː	i	happy, video
ɨ	ɪ	ɪ / ə / ɘ	ɪ̈	ɪ	ɪ	ɪ	ə	ɪ	kit
ɨ	ə	ɪ / ə / ɘ	ɪ̈	ɪ̈ / ə	ə	ɪ	ə	ɪ	bit
ɨ	ə	ə / ɘ	ə	ə	ə	ə	ə	ɪ	rabbit
ɨ	ə	ə / ɘ	ə	ə	ə	ə	ə	ə	accept, abbot
ə	ə	ə / ɘ	ə	ə	ə	ə	a	ə	sofa, better
ə	ʌ	ɜ	ɜ / ɐ	ɐ	ʌ	a	a	ʌ	strut, unknown
ʊ	ʊ	ʊ̈	ʊ̈	ʊ / ʊ̈	ʊ	ʊ	ʊ	ʊ	foot
ʉː	uː	ʉː	ʉː	—N/a	u	ʉː	ʉː	uː	goose
e	e	e	e	ɛ / e	e	e	e	e	dress
eː	eə	—N/a	eː	—N/a	eː	eː	eə	eə	square
øː	ɜː	—N/a	ø̈ː	—N/a	ɜ	ɜː	øː	ɜː	nurse
o	—N/a	—N/a	o	—N/a	—N/a	—N/a	—N/a	—N/a	gogga
oː	ɔː	oː	oː	ɔː	ɔ	oː	oː	ɔː	thought, north
ɛ	æ	ɛ	æ̝	æ / ɛ	ɛ	æ	ɛ	æ	trap
a	—N/a	—N/a	ɐ	ä	—N/a	—N/a	—N/a	—N/a	pap, gogga
ɒ	ɒ	ɒ̈	ɒ̝̈	ɒ	ɒ	ɔ	ɒ	ɒ	lot
ɑː	ɑː	ɑː / ɒː	ɑ̟ː	ɑ	ɑ	aː	aː	ɑː	palm, start
eɪ	əɪ	—N/a	eɪ	—N/a	əj	æɪ	æɪ	eɪ	face
aɪ	aɪ	ɐː	äɪ / äː	aɪ	aː	ɑɪ	aɪ	aɪ	price
ɔɪ	ɔɪ	—N/a	ɔɪ	—N/a	ɔj	oɪ	oɪ	ɔɪ	choice
œʊ	əʊ	—N/a	œ̈ɤ̈	—N/a	əw / ʌː	əʉ	aʉ	əʊ	goat
ɑʊ	aʊ	ɑ̈ː	ɑ̈ɤ	—N/a	ɑw	æɔ	æʊ	aʊ	mouth
ɪə	ɪə	—N/a	ɪə	—N/a	iə	ɪə	iə	ɪə	near
ɪə	—N/a	—N/a	ɪə	—N/a	—N/a	—N/a	—N/a	—N/a	kreef
ʊə	ʊə	—N/a	ʊ̈ə	—N/a	ʊə	ʉːə	ʉə	ʊə	cure
ʊə	ʊə	—N/a	ʊ̈ə	—N/a	ʊə	ʉː	ʉə	ʊə	fury
ʊə	ʊə	—N/a	ʊ̈ə	—N/a	ʊə	oː	ʉə	ʊə	sure
ʊə	—N/a	—N/a	ʊ̈ə	—N/a	—N/a	—N/a	—N/a	—N/a	oom

== Consonants ==
=== Plosives ===
- In Broad White South African English, voiceless plosives tend to be unaspirated in all positions, which serves as a marker of this subvariety. This is usually thought to be an Afrikaans influence.
- General and Cultivated varieties aspirate /p, t, k/ before a stressed syllable, unless they are followed by an /s/ within the same syllable.
  - Speakers of the General variety can strongly affricate the syllable-final /t/ to [ts], so that wanting /ˈwɒntɨŋ/ can be pronounced [ˈwɒntsɪŋ].
- /t, d/ are normally alveolar. In the Broad variety, they tend to be dental [t̪, d̪]. This pronunciation also occurs in older speakers of the Jewish subvariety of General SAE.

=== Fricatives and affricates ===
- /x/ occurs only in words borrowed from Afrikaans and Khoisan languages, such as gogga /ˈxoxa/ 'insect'. Many speakers realise /x/ as uvular [χ], a sound which is more common in Afrikaans.
- /θ/ may be realised as [f] in Broad varieties (see Th-fronting), but it is more accurate to say that it is a feature of Afrikaans English. This is especially common word-finally (as in myth [məf]).
- In the Indian variety, the labiodental fricatives /f, v/ are realised without audible friction, i.e. as approximants [ʋ̥, ʋ].
- In General and Cultivated varieties, intervocalic /h/ may be voiced, so that ahead can be pronounced [əˈɦed].
- There is not a full agreement about the voicing of /h/ in Broad varieties:
  - Lass (2002) states that:
    - Voiced [ɦ] is the normal realisation of /h/ in Broad varieties.
    - It is often deleted, e.g. in word-initial stressed syllables (as in house), but at least as often, it is pronounced even if it seems deleted. The vowel that follows the [ɦ] allophone in the word-initial syllable often carries a low or low rising tone, which, in rapid speech, can be the only trace of the deleted /h/. That creates potentially minimal tonal pairs like oh (neutral [ʌʊ˧] or high falling [ʌʊ˦˥˩], phonemically /œʊ/) vs. hoe (low [ʌʊ˨] or low rising [ʌʊ˩˨], phonemically /hœʊ/). In General, these are normally pronounced [œː] and [hœː], without any tonal difference.
  - Bowerman (2004) states that in Broad varieties close to Afrikaans English, /h/ is voiced [ɦ] before a stressed vowel.

=== Sonorants ===
- General and Broad varieties have a wine–whine merger. However, some speakers of Cultivated SAE (particularly the elderly) still distinguish /hw/ from /w/, so that which /hwɪtʃ/ is not homophonous with witch /wɪtʃ/. In General and Broad, those are homophonous as /wɨtʃ/.
- /l/ has two allophones:
  - Clear (neutral or somewhat palatalised) [l] in syllable-initial and intervocalic positions (as in look [lʊk] and polar [ˈpœːlə]).
    - In Cultivated variety, clear [l] is often also used word-finally when another word begins with a vowel (as in call up [koːl ˈəp], which in General and Broad is pronounced [koːɫ ˈəp]).
  - Velarised [lˠ] (or uvularised [lʶ]) in pre-consonantal and word-final positions.
    - One source states that the dark /l/ has a "hollow pharyngealised" quality [lˤ], rather than velarised or uvularised.
- In the Broad variety, the sequences /ɨn/ and /ɨl/ tend not to form syllabic [n̩] and [l̩] where they correspond to /ən, əl/ in RP, so that button /ˈbətɨn/ and middle /ˈmɨdɨl/ are phonetically [ˈbɐtɨn] and [ˈmədɯl] (compare General [ˈbətn̩] and [ˈmɨdl̩]). John Wells analyses the broad pronunciation of these words as having a secondarily stressed schwa in the last syllable: /ˈbətˌɨn/, /ˈmɨdˌɨl/.
- /r/ has a number of possible realizations:
  - In Cultivated and General varieties, /r/ is an approximant, usually postalveolar or (less commonly) retroflex. In emphatic speech, Cultivated speakers may realise /r/ as a (often long) trill [r]. Older speakers of the Cultivated variety may realise intervocalic /r/ as a tap [ɾ] (as in very [ˈveɾɪ]), a feature which is becoming increasingly rare.
  - Broad SAE realises /r/ as a tap [ɾ], sometimes even as a trill [r] - a pronunciation which is at times stigmatised as a marker of this variety. The trill [r] is more commonly considered a feature of the second language Afrikaans English variety.
  - Another possible realisation of /r/ is uvular trill [ʀ], which has been reported to occur in the Cape Flats dialect.
  - South African English is non-rhotic, except for some Broad varieties spoken in the Cape Province (typically in -er suffixes, as in writer [ˈraɪtɚ]). It appears that postvocalic /r/ is entering the speech of younger people under the influence of American English.
  - Linking /r/ (as in for a while /foː ə ˈwaɪl/) is used only by some speakers: [foːɹ ə ˈwaːl].
  - There is not a full agreement about intrusive /r/ (as in law and order) in South African English:
    - Lass (2002) states that it is rare, and some speakers with linking /r/ never use the intrusive /r/.
    - Bowerman (2004) states that it is absent from this variety.
    - In contexts where many British and Australian accents use the intrusive /r/, speakers of South African English who do not use the intrusive /r/ create an intervocalic hiatus. In these varieties, phrases such as law and order /ˈloː ən ˈoːdə/ can be subject to the following processes:
      - Vowel deletion: [ˈloːn ˈoːdə];
      - Adding a semivowel corresponding to the preceding vowel: [ˈloːwən ˈoːdə];
      - Inserting a glottal stop: [ˈloːʔən ˈoːdə]. This is typical of Broad varieties.
- Before a high front vowel, /j/ undergoes fortition to [ɣ] in Broad and some of the General varieties, so that yeast can be pronounced [ɣiːst].

== See also ==
- Australian English phonology
- New Zealand English phonology
- Regional accents of English

== Bibliography ==
- Bekker, Ian (2008). The vowels of South African English (PDF) (Ph.D.). north-West University, Potchefstroom.
- Bowerman, Sean (2004), "White South African English: phonology", in Schneider, Edgar W.; Burridge, Kate; Kortmann, Bernd; Mesthrie, Rajend; Upton, Clive (eds.), A handbook of varieties of English, vol. 1: Phonology, Mouton de Gruyter, pp. 931–942, ISBN 3-11-017532-0
- Branford, William (1994). "9: English in South Africa". In Burchfield, Robert (ed.). The Cambridge History of the English Language. Vol. 5: English in Britain and Overseas: Origins and Development. Cambridge University Press. pp. 430–496. ISBN 0-521-26478-2.
- Collins, Beverley; Mees, Inger M. (2013) [First published 2003], Practical Phonetics and Phonology: A Resource Book for Students (3rd ed.), Routledge, ISBN 978-0-415-50650-2
- Finn, Peter (2004), "Cape Flats English: phonology", in Schneider, Edgar W.; Burridge, Kate; Kortmann, Bernd; Mesthrie, Rajend; Upton, Clive (eds.), A handbook of varieties of English, vol. 1: Phonology, Mouton de Gruyter, pp. 964–984, ISBN 3-11-017532-0
- Lass, Roger (1984), "Vowel System Universals and Typology: Prologue to Theory", Phonology Yearbook, 1, Cambridge University Press: 75–111, doi:10.1017/S0952675700000300, JSTOR 4615383
- — (1990), "A 'standard' South African vowel system", in Ramsaran, Susan (ed.), Studies in the Pronunciation of English: A Commemorative Volume in Honour of A.C. Gimson, Routledge, pp. 272–285, ISBN 978-0-41507180-2
- — (2002), "South African English", in Mesthrie, Rajend (ed.), Language in South Africa, Cambridge University Press, ISBN 9780521791052
- Mesthrie, Rajend (2004), "Indian South African English: phonology", in Schneider, Edgar W.; Burridge, Kate; Kortmann, Bernd; Mesthrie, Rajend; Upton, Clive (eds.), A handbook of varieties of English, vol. 1: Phonology, Mouton de Gruyter, pp. 953–963, ISBN 3-11-017532-0
- Rogers, Henry (2014) [First published 2000], The Sounds of Language: An Introduction to Phonetics, Essex: Routledge, ISBN 978-0-582-38182-7
- Wells, John C. (1982). Accents of English. Vol. 3: Beyond the British Isles (pp. i–xx, 467–674). Cambridge University Press. doi:10.1017/CBO9780511611766. ISBN 0-52128541-0.
