= Open-mid front unrounded vowel =

Vowel sound represented by ⟨ɛ⟩ in IPA

ɛ
- IPA number: 303

Audio sample
- source · help

Encoding
- Entity (decimal): &#603;
- Unicode (hex): U+025B
- X-SAMPA: E
- Braille: ⠜ (braille pattern dots-345)
Image

IPA: Vowels

	Front	Central	Back
Close	i y	ɨ ʉ	ɯ u
Near-close	ɪ ʏ		ʊ
Close-mid	e ø	ɘ ɵ	ɤ o
Mid	e̞ ø̞	ə	ɤ̞ o̞
Open-mid	ɛ œ	ɜ ɞ	ʌ ɔ
Near-open	æ	ɐ
Open	a ɶ	ä	ɑ ɒ

- IPA help
- audio
- full chart
- template

Legend: unrounded • rounded

The open-mid front unrounded vowel, or low-mid front unrounded vowel, is a type of vowel sound used in some spoken languages. The symbol in the International Phonetic Alphabet that represents this sound is the Latin epsilon, a Latinized variant of the Greek lowercase epsilon, ⟨ɛ⟩.

== Features ==
- Its vowel height is open-mid, also known as low-mid, which means the tongue is positioned halfway between an open vowel (a low vowel) and a mid vowel.
- Its vowel backness is front, which means the tongue is positioned forward in the mouth without creating a constriction that would be classified as a consonant.
- It is unrounded, which means that the lips are not rounded.
Sagittal section of a vocal tract pronouncing the IPA sound ⟨ɛ⟩. Note that a wavy glottis in this diagram indicates a voiced sound.

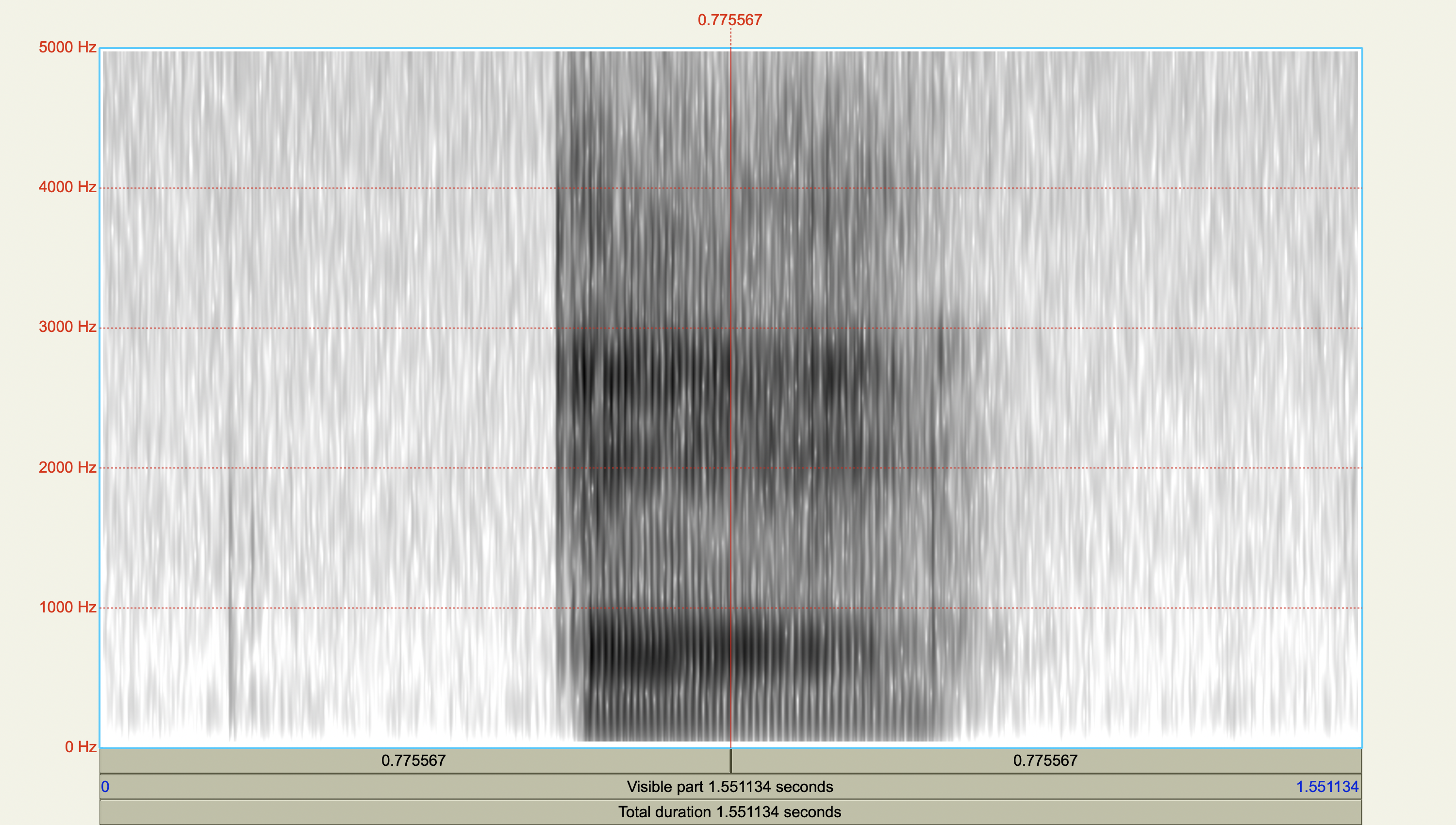
Spectrogram of [ɛ]

== Occurrence ==
Language		Word	IPA	Meaning	Notes
Akan (Twi)		ɛyɛ	[ɛjɛ]	'it is good/fine'	See Akan phonology
Arabic	Quranic	اَتٰىهُمْ/atāhum	[atɛːhum]	'he came to them'	/aː/ in Modern Standard Arabic. See Arabic phonology
Armenian	Eastern	էջ/ēj	[ɛd͡ʒ]	'page'	
Bavarian	Amstetten dialect				Typically transcribed in IPA with ⟨æ⟩.
Bengali		ব্যাঙ/bêṅ	[bɛŋ]	'frog'	Also pronounced as /æ/. See Bengali phonology
Breton		gwenn	[ˈɡwɛnː]	'white'	ɛ
Bulgarian		пет/pet	[pɛt̪]	'five'	See Bulgarian phonology
Catalan	Central	sec	[ˈs̺ɛk]	'dry'	Standard Central Catalan pronunciation of historical /e/ (found in most Western dialects). Corresponds to a mid central vowel /ə/ in the Balearic subdialects, except Ibizan and partially Menorcan. See Catalan phonology
Catalan	Most dialects	set	[ˈs̺ɛt̪]	'seven'	Lower ([æ]) and/or retracted ([æ̠]) in Valencian and some Balearic subdialects. See Catalan phonology
Catalan	Some North-Western speakers	aigua	[ˈajɣ̞wɛ]	'water'	Pronunciation of the final unstressed /a/, typically associated with the province of Lleida. See Catalan phonology
Chinese	Cantonese	屐 / kek6	[kʰɛːk̚˨]	'clogs'	See Cantonese phonology
Chinese	Mandarin	天 / tiān	[tʰi̯ɛn˥]	'sky'	Height varies between mid and mid-open depending on the speaker. See Standard Chinese phonology
Chuvash		ҫепĕҫ/şepĕş	[ˈɕɛp̬ɘɕ]	'gentle, tender'	
Czech		led	[lɛt]	'ice'	See Czech phonology
Danish	Standard	frisk	[ˈfʁɛsk]	'fresh'	Most often transcribed in IPA with ⟨æ⟩. See Danish phonology
Dutch	Standard	bed	[bɛt]	'bed'	See Dutch phonology
Dutch	The Hague	jij	[jɛ̞ː]	'you'	Corresponds to [ɛi] in standard Dutch.
English	General American	bed	[bɛd]	'bed'	
English	Northern England	bed	[bɛd]	'bed'	May be somewhat lowered.
English	Received Pronunciation	bed	[bɛd]	'bed'	Older RP speakers pronounce a closer vowel [e̞]. See English phonology
English	Younger General Australian speakers	bed	[bɛd]	'bed'	Realization of /e/ due to an ongoing short-front vowel chain shift. See Australian English phonology
English	Scottish	bed	[bɛd]	'bed'	
English	Cockney	fat	[fɛt]	'fat'	
English	Singaporean	fat	[fɛt]	'fat'	
English	New Zealand	fat	[fɛt]	'fat'	See New Zealand English phonology
English	Broad Australian	fat	[fɛt]	'fat'	Realization of /æ/. General Australian speakers realize this vowel as [æ] or [a]. See Australian English phonology
English	Some Broad; South African speakers	fat	[fɛt]	'fat'	Other speakers realize this vowel as [æ] or [a]. See South African English phonology
English	Belfast	days	[dɛːz]	'days'	Pronounced [iə] in closed syllables; corresponds to [eɪ] in RP.
English	Zulu	mate	[mɛt]	'mate'	Speakers exhibit the met–mate merger.
Faroese		frekt	[fɹɛʰkt]	'greedy'	See Faroese phonology
French		sept	[sɛt̪]	'seven'	See French phonology
Galician		ferro	[ˈfɛro̝]	'iron'	See Galician phonology
Georgian		გედი/gedi	[ɡɛdi]	'swan'	
German	Standard	Bett	[b̥ɛt]	'bed'	Also described as mid [ɛ̝]. See Standard German phonology
German	Franconian accent	oder	[ˈoːdɛ]	'or'	Used instead of [ɐ]. See Standard German phonology
German	Coastal Northern accents	oder	[ˈoːdɛ]	'or'	Used instead of [ɐ]. See Standard German phonology
German	Swabian accent	fett	[fɛt]	'fat'	Contrasts with the close-mid [e]. See Standard German phonology
German	Western Swiss accents	See	[z̥ɛː]	'lake'	Close-mid [eː] in other accents; contrasts with the near-open [æː]. See Standard German phonology
Hebrew	Tiberian	אֶרֶץ / ʾereṣ	[ˈʔɛrɛsˤ]	'land'	/e̞/ in Modern Israeli Hebrew. See Tiberian Hebrew phonology and Modern Hebrew phonology
Hindustani	Hindi–Urdu	ख़ैरियत–خیریت / khairiyat	[xɛːɾɪjət̪]	'well-being'	See Hindustani phonology.
Hungarian		lesz	[ˈlɛsː]	'will be'	Allophone of [æ].
Italian		bene	[ˈbɛːne]	'good'	See Italian phonology
Indonesian		bebek	[ˈbɛ.bɛʔ]	'duck'	See Indonesian phonology
Kaingang		mbre	[ˈᵐbɾɛ]	'with'	
Korean		매미 / maemi	[mɛːmi]	'cicada'	Merged with /e/ for many speakers. See Korean phonology
Kurdish	Kurmanji (Northern)	hevde	[hɛvdɛ]	'seventeen'	See Kurdish phonology
Kurdish	Sorani (Central)	هه‌ڤده/hevde	[hɛvdæ]	'seventeen'	See Kurdish phonology
Kurdish	Pehlewî (Southern)	هه‌ڤده/hevde	[hɛvdæ]	'seventeen'	See Kurdish phonology
Limburgish		crème	[kʀ̝ɛːm]	'cream'	The example word is from the Maastrichtian dialect.
Lithuanian		mesti	[mɛs̪t̪ɪ]	'throw'	See Lithuanian phonology
Lower Sorbian		serp	[s̪ɛrp]	'sickle'	
Luxembourgish		Stär	[ʃtɛːɐ̯]	'star'	Allophone of /eː/ before /ʀ/. See Luxembourgish phonology
Macedonian	Standard	мед/med	[ˈmɛd̪]	'honey'	See Macedonian language § Vowels
Malay	Standard	paling	[pälɛŋ]	'most'	Possible realisation of /i/ and /e/ in closed final syllables. See Malay phonology
Malay	Negeri Sembilan	cepat	[cɔpɛʔ]	'quick'	See Negeri Sembilan Malay
Malay	Negeri Sembilan	karpet	[käpɛʔ]	'carpet'	See Negeri Sembilan Malay
Malay	Kelatan-Pattani	ayam	[äjɛː]	'chicken'	See Kelatan-Pattani
Malay	Terengganu	biasa	[bɛsə]	'normal'	See Terengganu Malay
Malay	Perak	mata	[matɛ]	'eye'	See Perak Malay
Malay	Perak	kero	[kɛro̞]	'crab'	See Perak Malay
Norman	Jersey	affaûrder	[afɔrˈdɛ]	'to afford'	
Norwegian	Sognamål	pest	[pʰɛst]	'plague'	See Norwegian phonology
Occitan		grèga	[ˈɣɾɛɣɔ]	'Greek'	See Occitan phonology
Polish		ten	[t̪ɛn̪]	'this one' (nom. m.)	See Polish phonology
Portuguese	Most dialects	pé	[ˈpɛ]	'foot'	Stressed vowel might be lower [æ]. The presence and use of other unstressed ⟨e⟩ allophones, such as [e̞ e ɪ i ɨ], varies according to dialect.
Portuguese	Some speakers	tempo	[ˈt̪ɛ̃mpu]	'time'	Timbre differences for nasalized vowels are mainly kept in European Portuguese. See Portuguese phonology
Romanian	Transylvanian dialects	vede	[ˈvɛɟe]	'(he) sees'	Corresponds to mid [e̞] in standard Romanian. See Romanian phonology
Russian		это/eto	[ˈɛt̪ə]	'this'	See Russian phonology
Shiwiar					Allophone of /a/.
Slovene		met	[mɛ́t]	'throw' (n.)	See Slovene phonology
Spanish	Eastern Andalusian	las madres	[læ̞ː ˈmæ̞ːð̞ɾɛː]	'the mothers'	Corresponds to [e̞] in other dialects, but in these dialects they are distinct. See Spanish phonology
Spanish	Murcian	las madres	[læ̞ː ˈmæ̞ːð̞ɾɛː]	'the mothers'	Corresponds to [e̞] in other dialects, but in these dialects they are distinct. See Spanish phonology
Swahili		shule	[ʃulɛ]	'school'	
Swedish	Central Standard	ät	[ɛ̠ːt̪]	'eat' (imp.)	Somewhat retracted. See Swedish phonology
Tagalog		peke	[ˈpɛxɛʔ]	'fake'	See Tagalog phonology
Telugu		చేప/cēa	[tʃɛːa]	'Fish'	
Telugu		మేక/mēka	[mɛːka]	'Goat'	
Thai		แตร / trae	[trɛː˧]	'horn (instrument)'	
Turkish		ülke	[yl̠ʲˈcɛ]	'country'	Allophone of /e/ described variously as "word-final" and "occurring in final open syllable of a phrase". See Turkish phonology
Ukrainian		день/den'	[dɛnʲ]	'day'	See Ukrainian phonology
Upper Sorbian		čelo	[ˈt͡ʃɛlɔ]	'calf'	
Welsh		nesaf	[nɛsav]	'next'	See Welsh phonology
West Frisian		beppe	[ˈbɛpə]	'grandma'	See West Frisian phonology
Yiddish		אלול / elel	[ˈɛləl]	'Elul'	See Yiddish phonology
Yoruba		ẹsẹ̀	[ɛ̄sɛ]	'leg'	

== See also ==
- Index of phonetics articles

== Notes ==
Place →	Labial					Coronal										Dorsal					Laryngeal			
Manner ↓	Bilabial		Labiodental		Linguolabial		Dental		Alveolar		Postalveolar		Retroflex		(Alveolo-)palatal		Velar		Uvular		Pharyngeal/epiglottal		Glottal	
Nasal	m̥	m	ɱ̊	ɱ		n̼	n̪̊	n̪	n̥	n	n̠̊	n̠	ɳ̊	ɳ	ɲ̊	ɲ	ŋ̊	ŋ	ɴ̥	ɴ				
Plosive	p	b	p̪	b̪	t̼	d̼	t̪	d̪	t	d			ʈ	ɖ	c	ɟ	k	ɡ	q	ɢ	ʡ		ʔ	
Sibilant affricate							t̪s̪	d̪z̪	ts	dz	t̠ʃ	d̠ʒ	tʂ	dʐ	tɕ	dʑ								
Non-sibilant affricate	pɸ	bβ	p̪f	b̪v			t̪θ	d̪ð	tɹ̝̊	dɹ̝	t̠ɹ̠̊˔	d̠ɹ̠˔			cç	ɟʝ	kx	ɡɣ	qχ	ɢʁ	ʡʜ	ʡʢ	ʔh	
Sibilant fricative							s̪	z̪	s	z	ʃ	ʒ	ʂ	ʐ	ɕ	ʑ								
Non-sibilant fricative	ɸ	β	f	v	θ̼	ð̼	θ	ð	θ̠	ð̠	ɹ̠̊˔	ɹ̠˔	ɻ̊˔	ɻ˔	ç	ʝ	x	ɣ	χ	ʁ	ħ	ʕ	h	ɦ
Approximant		β̞		ʋ				ð̞		ɹ		ɹ̠		ɻ		j		ɰ						˷
Tap/flap		ⱱ̟		ⱱ					ɾ̥	ɾ			ɽ̊	ɽ						ɢ̆		ʡ̆		
Trill	ʙ̥	ʙ							r̥	r		r̠	ɽ̊r̥	ɽr					ʀ̥	ʀ	ʜ	ʢ		
Lateral affricate									tɬ	dɮ			tꞎ	d𝼅	c𝼆	ɟʎ̝	k𝼄	ɡʟ̝						
Lateral fricative							ɬ̪		ɬ	ɮ			ꞎ	𝼅	𝼆	ʎ̝	𝼄	ʟ̝						
Lateral approximant								l̪	l̥	l		l̠	ɭ̊	ɭ	ʎ̥	ʎ	ʟ̥	ʟ		ʟ̠				
Lateral tap/flap									ɺ̥	ɺ			𝼈̊	𝼈		ʎ̆		ʟ̆						

		BL	LD	D	A	PA	RF	P	V	U
Implosive	Voiced	ɓ			ɗ		ᶑ	ʄ	ɠ	ʛ
Implosive	Voiceless	ɓ̥			ɗ̥		ᶑ̊	ʄ̊	ɠ̊	ʛ̥
Ejective	Stop	pʼ			tʼ		ʈʼ	cʼ	kʼ	qʼ
Ejective	Affricate		p̪fʼ	tθʼ	tsʼ	tʃʼ	tʂʼ	tɕʼ	kxʼ	qχʼ
Ejective	Fricative	ɸʼ	fʼ	θʼ	sʼ	ʃʼ	ʂʼ	ɕʼ	xʼ	χʼ
Ejective	Lateral affricate				tɬʼ			c𝼆ʼ	k𝼄ʼ	q𝼄ʼ
Ejective	Lateral fricative				ɬʼ					
Click (top: velar; bottom: uvular)	Tenuis	kʘ qʘ		kǀ qǀ	kǃ qǃ		k𝼊 q𝼊	kǂ qǂ		
Click (top: velar; bottom: uvular)	Voiced	ɡʘ ɢʘ		ɡǀ ɢǀ	ɡǃ ɢǃ		ɡ𝼊 ɢ𝼊	ɡǂ ɢǂ		
Click (top: velar; bottom: uvular)	Nasal	ŋʘ ɴʘ		ŋǀ ɴǀ	ŋǃ ɴǃ		ŋ𝼊 ɴ𝼊	ŋǂ ɴǂ	ʞ	
Click (top: velar; bottom: uvular)	Tenuis lateral				kǁ qǁ					
Click (top: velar; bottom: uvular)	Voiced lateral				ɡǁ ɢǁ					
Click (top: velar; bottom: uvular)	Nasal lateral				ŋǁ ɴǁ					
