= Close central rounded vowel =

Vowel sound represented by ⟨ʉ⟩ in IPA

ʉ
- IPA number: 318

Audio sample
- source · help

Encoding
- Entity (decimal): &#649;
- Unicode (hex): U+0289
- X-SAMPA: }
- Braille: ⠴ (braille pattern dots-356) ⠥ (braille pattern dots-136)
Image

IPA: Vowels

	Front	Central	Back
Close	i y	ɨ ʉ	ɯ u
Near-close	ɪ ʏ		ʊ
Close-mid	e ø	ɘ ɵ	ɤ o
Mid	e̞ ø̞	ə	ɤ̞ o̞
Open-mid	ɛ œ	ɜ ɞ	ʌ ɔ
Near-open	æ	ɐ
Open	a ɶ	ä	ɑ ɒ

- IPA help
- audio
- full chart
- template

Legend: unrounded • rounded

The close central rounded vowel, or high central rounded vowel, is a type of vowel sound used in some spoken languages. The symbol in the International Phonetic Alphabet that represents this sound is ⟨ʉ⟩. The sound is also commonly referred to by the name of its symbol, "barred u".

The close central rounded vowel is the vocalic equivalent of the rare labialized post-palatal approximant [ẅ].

In most languages this rounded vowel is pronounced with protruded lips (endolabial). However, in a few cases the lips are compressed (exolabial).

== Close central protruded vowel ==
The close central protruded vowel is typically transcribed in IPA simply as ⟨ʉ⟩, and that is the convention used in this article. As there is no dedicated diacritic for protrusion in the IPA, symbol for the close central rounded vowel with an old diacritic for labialization, ⟨ ̫⟩, can be used as an ad hoc symbol ⟨ʉ̫⟩ for the close central protruded vowel. Another possible transcription is ⟨ʉʷ⟩ or ⟨ɨʷ⟩ (a close central vowel modified by endolabialization), but this could be misread as a diphthong.

=== Features ===
- Its vowel height is close, also known as high, which means the tongue is positioned close to the roof of the mouth without creating a constriction that would be classified as a consonant.
- Its vowel backness is central, which means the tongue is positioned halfway between a front vowel and a back vowel.
- Its roundedness is protruded, which means that the corners of the lips are drawn together, and the inner surfaces exposed.

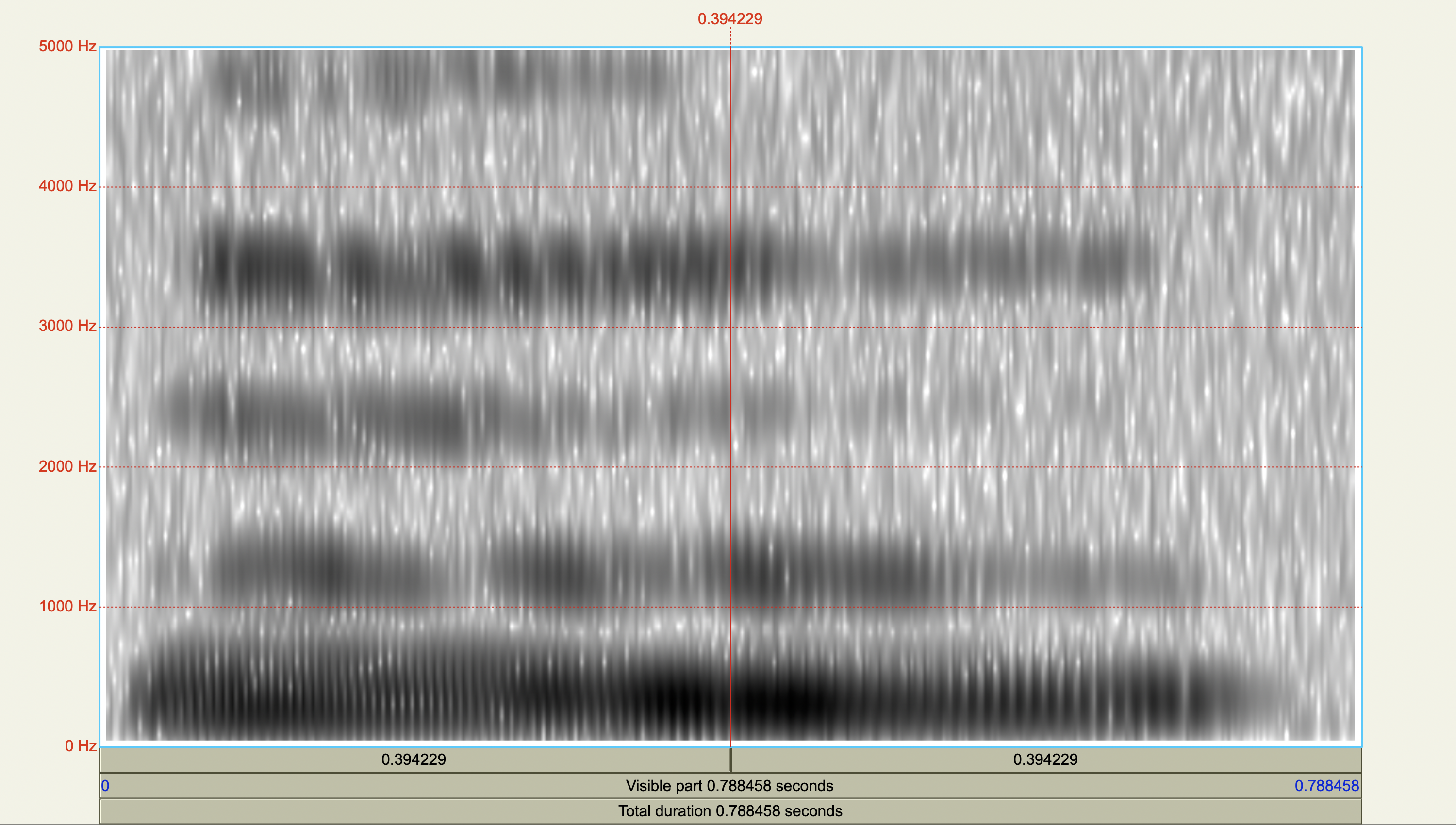
Spectrogram of [ʉ]

=== Occurrence ===
Because central rounded vowels are assumed to have protrusion, and few descriptions cover the distinction, some of the following may actually have compression.

Language		Word	IPA	Meaning	Notes
Angami	Khonoma	su	[sʉ˦]	'deep'	Allophone of /u/ after /s/.
Armenian	Some Eastern dialects	յուղ/yowġ	[jʉʁ]	'oil'	Allophone of /u/ after /j/.
Berber	Ayt Seghrouchen	ⵍⵍⴰⵢⴳⴳⵓⵔ /للايݣّور /llayggur	[lːæjˈɡːʉɾ]	'he goes'	Allophone of /u/ after velar consonants.
Dutch	Standard Northern	nu	[nʉ]	'now'	Typically transcribed in IPA with ⟨y⟩; also described as close front [y] and near-close front [y˕]. See Dutch phonology
English	Australian	goose	[ɡʉːs]	'goose'	See Australian English phonology
English	New Zealand	goose	[ɡʉːs]	'goose'	See New Zealand English phonology
English	Standard Southern British	goose	[ɡʉːs]	'goose'	Realized as back [uː] in the conservative variety.
English	Scouse	goose	[ɡʉːs]	'goose'	May (less commonly) be fully front [yː] instead.
English	South African	goose	[ɡʉːs]	'goose'	Realized as back [uː] in the conservative variety and in many Black and Indian varieties. See South African English phonology
English	General American	goose	[ɡʉs]	'goose'	Can be back [u] instead.
German	Upper Saxon	Buden	[ˈb̥ʉːd̥n̩]	'booths'	The example word is from the Chemnitz dialect.
Hausa					Allophone of /u/.
Ibibio	Dialect of the Uruan area and Uyo	fuuk	[fʉ́ʉk]	'cover many things/times'	Allophone of /u/ between consonants.
Ibibio	Some dialects				Phonemic; contrasts with /u/.
Irish	Munster	ciúin	[cʉːnʲ]	'quiet'	Allophone of /u/ between slender consonants. See Irish phonology
Irish	Ulster	úllaí	[ˈʉ̜l̪ˠi]	'apples'	Often only weakly rounded; may be transcribed in IPA with ⟨u⟩.
Irula			[mʉːj]	"to surround"	Has other centralized vowels.
Kurdish	Southern	müçig / مۊچگ	[mʉːˈt͡ʃɯɡ]	'dust'	See Kurdish phonology
Limburgish	Some dialects	bruudsje	[ˈbʀ̝ʉtʃə]	'breadroll'	Close [ʉ] or near-close [ʉ̞], depending on the dialect. Close front [y] in other dialects. Typically transcribed in IPA with ⟨y⟩. The example word is from the Maastrichtian dialect, in which the vowel is close.
Lüsu		[lʉ˥zʉ˥˧]		'Lüsu'	
Mochica		capæcnencæpæc	[kapʉknenkʉpʉk]	'lawyer'	Exact phonetic value uncertain. One of many proposed realizations.
Russian		кюрий/kyuriy	[ˈkʲʉrʲɪj]	'curium'	Allophone of /u/ between palatalized consonants. Near-close when unstressed. See Russian phonology
Scots		buit	[bʉt]	'boot'	May be more front [ʏ] instead.
Scottish Gaelic	older Lewis speakers	co-dhiù	[kʰɔˈjʉː]	'anyway'	Normal allophone of [uː]. Fronted as [yː] among younger speakers.
Scottish Gaelic	Wester Ross and Lochalsh	co-dhiù	[kʰɔˈjʉː]	'anyway'	Normal allophone of [uː].
Swedish	Bohuslän	yla	[²ʉᶻːlä]	'howl'	A fricated vowel that corresponds to [y̫ː] in Central Standard Swedish. See Swedish phonology
Swedish	Närke	yla	[²ʉᶻːlä]	'howl'	A fricated vowel that corresponds to [y̫ː] in Central Standard Swedish. See Swedish phonology
Tamil		வால்	[väːlʉ]	'tail'	Epenthetic vowel inserted in colloquial speech after word-final liquids; can be unrounded [ɨ] instead. See Tamil phonology

== Close central compressed vowel ==
Close central compressed vowel

ʉ᫦

ɨᵝ

ÿ
Image

As there are no diacritics in the IPA to distinguish protruded and compressed rounding, an old diacritic for labialization, ⟨◌᫦⟩ (the opposite of ⟨◌̫⟩), will be used here as an ad hoc symbol for compressed central vowels. It was only added to Unicode in 2025, however, and it may take some time for font support to catch up. Another attested transcription is ⟨ɨᵝ⟩ ([ɨ] modified with labial compression), though this may imply that the vowel is a diphthong (as indeed it is in Swedish).

The central-vowel stroke of ⟨ɨ ɵ ʉ⟩ may also be used with the front compressed vowel [y] to create the ad hoc symbol ⟨ɏ⟩, or the diacritic for centralization to create ⟨ÿ⟩.

=== Features ===
- Its vowel height is close, also known as high, which means the tongue is positioned close to the roof of the mouth without creating a constriction that would be classified as a consonant.
- Its vowel backness is central, which means the tongue is positioned halfway between a front vowel and a back vowel.
- Its roundedness is compressed, which means that the margins of the lips are tense and drawn together in such a way that the inner surfaces are not exposed.

=== Occurrence ===
This vowel is typically transcribed in IPA with ⟨ʉ⟩. It occurs in some dialects of Swedish, but see also close front compressed vowel. The close back vowels of Norwegian and Swedish are also compressed. See close back compressed vowel. It also occurs in Japanese as an allophone. Medumba has a compressed central vowel [ɨᵝ] where the corners of the mouth are not drawn together.

Language		Word	IPA	Meaning	Notes
Norwegian	Urban East	hus	[hʉ᫦ːs]	'house'	Typically transcribed in IPA with ⟨ʉː⟩. Also described as front [yː]. See Norwegian phonology
Swedish	Some dialects	ful	[fʉ᫦ːl]	'ugly'	More front [yː ~ ʏː] in Central Standard Swedish; typically transcribed in IPA as ⟨ʉː⟩. See Swedish phonology

== Near-close central protruded vowel ==
Near-close central rounded vowel

ʉ̞

ɵ̝

ʊ̈

Audio sample
- source · help
Image

Some languages feature the near-close central rounded vowel, which is slightly lower than a typical [ʉ]. It is most often transcribed in IPA with ⟨ʉ̞⟩, ⟨ʊ̈⟩ and ⟨ʊ̟⟩, but ⟨ɵ̝⟩ is also a possible transcription. The symbol ⟨ᵿ⟩, a conflation of ⟨ʊ⟩ and ⟨ʉ⟩, is used as an unofficial extension of the IPA to represent this sound by a number of publications, such as Accents of English by John C. Wells.

=== Features ===
- Its vowel height is near-close, also known as near-high, which means the tongue is not quite so constricted as a close vowel (high vowel).
- Its vowel backness is central, which means the tongue is positioned halfway between a front vowel and a back vowel.
- Its roundedness is protruded, which means that the corners of the lips are drawn together, and the inner surfaces exposed.

=== Occurrence ===
Language		Word	IPA	Meaning	Notes
Dutch	Randstad	hut	[ɦɵ̝t]	'hut'	Found in Amsterdam, Rotterdam and The Hague. Lower [ɵ] in Standard Dutch. See Dutch phonology
English	Estuary	foot	[fʉ̞ʔt]	'foot'	The exact height, backness and roundedness is variable.
English	Cockney	good	[ɡʊ̈d]	'good'	Only in some words, particularly good, otherwise realized as near-back [ʊ].
English	Rural white Southern American	good	[ɡʊ̈d]	'good'	Can be front [ʏ] instead.
English	Southeastern English	good	[ɡʊ̈d]	'good'	May be unrounded [ɪ̈] instead; it corresponds to [ʊ] in other dialects. See English phonology
English	Ulster	good	[ɡʊ̈d]	'good'	Short allophone of /u/.
English	Shetland	strut	[stɹʊ̈t]	'strut'	Can be [ɔ̟] or [ʌ] instead.
Russian		любить/lyubit'/ljubit'	[lʲʉ̞ˈbʲitʲ]	'to love'	Unstressed allophone of /u/ between palatalized consonants.

== Near-close central compressed vowel ==
Near-close central compressed vowel

ʉ̞᫧

ɨ̞ᵝ

ʏ̈
Image

As there are no diacritics in the IPA to distinguish protruded and compressed rounding, an old diacritic for labialization, ⟨◌᫦⟩ (the opposite of ⟨◌̫⟩), will be used here as an ad hoc symbol for compressed central vowels. It was only added to Unicode in 2025, however, and it may take some time for font support to catch up.

The central-vowel stroke of ⟨ɨ ɵ ʉ⟩ may also be used with the front compressed vowel [ʏ] to create the ad hoc symbol ⟨ʏ̵⟩, or the diacritic for centralization to create ⟨ʏ̈⟩.

=== Features ===
- Its vowel height is near-close, also known as near-high, which means the tongue is not quite so constricted as a close vowel (high vowel).
- Its vowel backness is central, which means the tongue is positioned halfway between a front vowel and a back vowel.
- Its roundedness is compressed, which means that the margins of the lips are tense and drawn together in such a way that the inner surfaces are not exposed.

=== Occurrence ===
Language		Word	IPA	Meaning	Notes
Japanese	Some younger speakers	空気 / kūki	[kʉ̞᫧ːki]	'air'	Allophone of /u/; near-back [ʊ᫦] for other speakers.
Japanese	Standard Tokyo pronunciation	寿司 / sushi	[sʉ̞᫧ɕi]	'sushi'	Allophone of /u/ after /s, z, t/ and palatalized consonants. See Japanese phonology

== See also ==
- Close back compressed vowel
- Close front protruded vowel

== Notes ==
Place →	Labial					Coronal										Dorsal					Laryngeal			
Manner ↓	Bilabial		Labiodental		Linguolabial		Dental		Alveolar		Postalveolar		Retroflex		(Alveolo-)palatal		Velar		Uvular		Pharyngeal/epiglottal		Glottal	
Nasal	m̥	m	ɱ̊	ɱ		n̼	n̪̊	n̪	n̥	n	n̠̊	n̠	ɳ̊	ɳ	ɲ̊	ɲ	ŋ̊	ŋ	ɴ̥	ɴ				
Plosive	p	b	p̪	b̪	t̼	d̼	t̪	d̪	t	d			ʈ	ɖ	c	ɟ	k	ɡ	q	ɢ	ʡ		ʔ	
Sibilant affricate							t̪s̪	d̪z̪	ts	dz	t̠ʃ	d̠ʒ	tʂ	dʐ	tɕ	dʑ								
Non-sibilant affricate	pɸ	bβ	p̪f	b̪v			t̪θ	d̪ð	tɹ̝̊	dɹ̝	t̠ɹ̠̊˔	d̠ɹ̠˔			cç	ɟʝ	kx	ɡɣ	qχ	ɢʁ	ʡʜ	ʡʢ	ʔh	
Sibilant fricative							s̪	z̪	s	z	ʃ	ʒ	ʂ	ʐ	ɕ	ʑ								
Non-sibilant fricative	ɸ	β	f	v	θ̼	ð̼	θ	ð	θ̠	ð̠	ɹ̠̊˔	ɹ̠˔	ɻ̊˔	ɻ˔	ç	ʝ	x	ɣ	χ	ʁ	ħ	ʕ	h	ɦ
Approximant		β̞		ʋ				ð̞		ɹ		ɹ̠		ɻ		j		ɰ						˷
Tap/flap		ⱱ̟		ⱱ					ɾ̥	ɾ			ɽ̊	ɽ						ɢ̆		ʡ̆		
Trill	ʙ̥	ʙ							r̥	r		r̠	ɽ̊r̥	ɽr					ʀ̥	ʀ	ʜ	ʢ		
Lateral affricate									tɬ	dɮ			tꞎ	d𝼅	c𝼆	ɟʎ̝	k𝼄	ɡʟ̝						
Lateral fricative							ɬ̪		ɬ	ɮ			ꞎ	𝼅	𝼆	ʎ̝	𝼄	ʟ̝						
Lateral approximant								l̪	l̥	l		l̠	ɭ̊	ɭ	ʎ̥	ʎ	ʟ̥	ʟ		ʟ̠				
Lateral tap/flap									ɺ̥	ɺ			𝼈̊	𝼈		ʎ̆		ʟ̆						

		BL	LD	D	A	PA	RF	P	V	U
Implosive	Voiced	ɓ			ɗ		ᶑ	ʄ	ɠ	ʛ
Implosive	Voiceless	ɓ̥			ɗ̥		ᶑ̊	ʄ̊	ɠ̊	ʛ̥
Ejective	Stop	pʼ			tʼ		ʈʼ	cʼ	kʼ	qʼ
Ejective	Affricate		p̪fʼ	t̪θʼ	tsʼ	t̠ʃʼ	tʂʼ	tɕʼ	kxʼ	qχʼ
Ejective	Fricative	ɸʼ	fʼ	θʼ	sʼ	ʃʼ	ʂʼ	ɕʼ	xʼ	χʼ
Ejective	Lateral affricate				tɬʼ			c𝼆ʼ	k𝼄ʼ	q𝼄ʼ
Ejective	Lateral fricative				ɬʼ					
Click (top: velar; bottom: uvular)	Tenuis	kʘ qʘ		kǀ qǀ	kǃ qǃ		k𝼊 q𝼊	kǂ qǂ		
Click (top: velar; bottom: uvular)	Voiced	ɡʘ ɢʘ		ɡǀ ɢǀ	ɡǃ ɢǃ		ɡ𝼊 ɢ𝼊	ɡǂ ɢǂ		
Click (top: velar; bottom: uvular)	Nasal	ŋʘ ɴʘ		ŋǀ ɴǀ	ŋǃ ɴǃ		ŋ𝼊 ɴ𝼊	ŋǂ ɴǂ	ʞ	
Click (top: velar; bottom: uvular)	Tenuis lateral				kǁ qǁ					
Click (top: velar; bottom: uvular)	Voiced lateral				ɡǁ ɢǁ					
Click (top: velar; bottom: uvular)	Nasal lateral				ŋǁ ɴǁ					
