= New Zealand English phonology =

Phonological system of New Zealand English

Speech example
An example of a female from Christchurch (Eleanor Catton).

Speech example
An example of a male from Auckland (Mark Hanna).

This article covers the phonological system of New Zealand English. While most New Zealanders speak differently depending on their level of cultivation (i.e. the closeness to Received Pronunciation), this article covers the accent as it is spoken by educated speakers, unless otherwise noted. The IPA transcription is one designed by Bauer et al. (2007) specifically to faithfully represent a New Zealand accent, which this article follows in most aspects (see table under § Transcriptions).

== Vowels ==
Variation in New Zealand vowels
Lexical set	Phoneme	Phonetic realization	
Lexical set	Phoneme	Cultivated	Broad
DRESS	/e/	[e̞]	[ɪ]
TRAP	/ɛ/	[æ]	[e̞]
KIT	/ə/	[ɪ̈]	[ə]
NEAR	/iə̯/	[ɪə̯]	[iə̯]
SQUARE	/eə̯/	[e̞ə̯]	[iə̯]
FACE	/æɪ̯/	[æɪ̯]	[äɪ̯]
PRICE	/aɪ̯/	[ɑ̟ɪ̯]	[ɒ̝ˑɪ̯] [ɔɪ̯]
GOAT	/aʉ̯/	[ɵ̞ʊ̯]	[äʉ̯]
MOUTH	/æʊ̯/	[äʊ̯]	[e̞ə̯]

=== Monophthongs ===
Monophthongs of New Zealand English, from Hay, Maclagan & Gordon (2008:21).

Variation of monophthongs in New Zealand English, from Bauer et al. (2007:98).

The vowels of New Zealand English are similar to those of other non-rhotic dialects such as Australian English and Received Pronunciation (RP), but with some distinctive variations, which are indicated by the transcriptions for New Zealand vowels in the tables below:

Monophthongs
	Front		Central		Back	
	short	long	short	long	short	long
Close	e	iː	ʊ	ʉː		oː
Mid	ɛ	øː	ə		ɒ	
Open			a	aː		

TRAP–DRESS–KIT chain shift
æ > e̞ > ɪ > ə

- The original short front vowels [æ, e̞, ɪ] (TRAP, DRESS, KIT) have undergone a chain shift to [ɛ, e̝, ə]. Acoustic studies featuring both Australian and New Zealand voices show the accents were more similar before World War II and the short front vowels have changed considerably since then as compared to Australian English. Before the shift, these vowels were pronounced close to the corresponding RP sounds. The stages of the shift are described below.
  1. TRAP was raised from near-open [æ] to open-mid [ɛ].
  2. DRESS was raised from mid [e̞] to close-mid [e].
  3. KIT [ɪ] was first centralised to [ɪ̈] and then was lowered to [ə], merging with the word-internal allophone of /ə/ as in abbot /ˈɛbət/. This effectively removes the distinction between full and reduced vowels from the dialect as it makes /ə/ a stressable vowel.
  4. The now-close-mid DRESS [e] was further raised to near-close [e̝]. This encroaches on the vowel space of FLEECE.
  - Realisation of DRESS varies between near-close front [e̝], near-close near-front [ɪ], close-mid front [e], or close-mid near-front [e̠].
  - Cultivated NZE retains the open pronunciations [æ] for TRAP and [e̞] for DRESS and has a high central KIT ([ɪ̈]).
  - It is noted that TRAP was likely already pronounced [ɛ] among the original colonial settlers of New Zealand.
  - The difference in frontness and closeness of the KIT vowel ([ɪ̈ ~ ə] in New Zealand, [i] in Australia) has led to a long-running joke between Australians and New Zealanders whereby Australians accuse New Zealanders of saying "fush and chups" for fish and chips and in turn New Zealanders accuse Australians of saying "feesh and cheeps" in light of Australia's own KIT vowel shift.

COMMA

- In the morpheme-final position, the distinction between /ə/ (KIT, COMMA, LETTER) and /a/ (STRUT) is neutralized towards the open /a/ in the word-final position and towards the mid /ə/ elsewhere. For instance, the plural of sofa [ˈsaʉ̯fa] is [ˈsaʉ̯fəz], with the mid /ə/. Because of that, the names of the lexical sets COMMA and LETTER are not used in this article.

KIT

- Before the velar nasal, the vowel is much more close and front ([ɪ]) than in other environments. Some speakers also use this variant before /ɡ/ and, less often, before other consonants. It is transcribed with a plain ⟨ə⟩ in this article and so not differentiated from other allophones of /ə/.
- Initial unstressed KIT is at times as open as STRUT, so that inalterable /ənˈoːltəɹəbəl/ can fall together with unalterable /anˈoːltəɹəbəl/, resulting in a variable phonetic KIT–STRUT merger. This is less common and so it is not transcribed in this article.

FLEECE

- The FLEECE vowel /iː/ may be realised with a slight on-glide when the word is stressed, with /fliːs/ becoming [fləis]. This onglide is increasingly becoming the main way to differentiate FLEECE from DRESS in younger speakers as the latter vowel is a very closed [e̝] and there is a negligible length difference between the FLEECE vowel /iː/ and short vowels.
- The unstressed close front vowel in happy and video is tense and so it belongs to the /iː/ phoneme: /ˈhɛpiː/, /ˈvədiːaʉ̯/.

GOOSE

- The GOOSE vowel /ʉː/ is very central, and may be realised with an on-glide, with /ɡʉːs/ becoming [ɡəʉs].

NURSE

- The NURSE vowel /øː/ is not only higher and more front than the corresponding RP vowel /ɜː/, but it is also realised with rounded lips, unlike its RP counterpart. John Wells remarks that the surname Turner /ˈtøːnə/ [ˈtøːnɐ] as pronounced by a New Zealander may sound very similar to a German word Töne /ˈtøːnə/ (meaning 'tones'). Possible phonetic realizations include near-close front [ʏː], near-close central [ɵ̝ː], close-mid front [øː], close-mid central [ɵː], mid front [ø̞ː] and open-mid front [œː]. It appears that realizations lower than close-mid are more prestigious than those of close-mid height and higher, so that pronunciations of the word nurse such as [nø̞ːs] and [nœːs] are less broad than [nøːs], [nɵːs] etc. Close allophones may overlap with monophthongal realizations of /ʉː/. Sources conflict on whether there may be a potential or incipient NURSE–GOOSE merger.

STRUT, START

- STRUT /a/ forms a short-long pair with START /aː/, which means that hut /hat/ contrasts with heart /haːt/ purely by length, like in Australian English. The quality of those vowels is that of retracted cardinal [a]: [a̠, a̠ː], open central [ä, äː], or somewhat higher [æ̠(ː) ~ ɐ(ː)].

TRAP–BATH split

- New Zealand English has the TRAP–BATH split: words like dance /daːns/, chance /tʃaːns/, plant /plaːnt/ and grant /ɡɹaːnt/ are pronounced with an /aː/ sound, as in Southern England and South Australia. However, for many decades prior to World War II there existed an almost even split between the pronunciation of dance as /daːns/ or /dɛns/, plant as /plaːnt/ or /plɛnt/, etc. Can't is also pronounced /kaːnt/ in New Zealand (like Australia but unlike the North American pronunciation /kænt/ with the TRAP vowel). Some older Southland speakers use the TRAP vowel rather than the PALM vowel in dance, chance and castle, so that they are pronounced /dɛns, tʃɛns, ˈkɛsəl/ rather than /daːns, tʃaːns, ˈkaːsəl/.

THOUGHT

- The THOUGHT vowel may have an off-glide, more often word-finally but also in closed syllables, turning oar /oː/ into [oːə] or [ɔ̝̈ːə].
- It is can be slightly centralised ([ö]) and ranges between [o̝] and [ɔ̝] in height.

LOT

- The LOT vowel is open-mid and somewhat centralised, between [ɞ] and [ɔ], more precisely [ɞ̠] and [ɔ̟].
- The vowel may sometimes be unrounded.
- The LOT vowel can be phonetically short before /-m/ and /-n/ (with possible exceptions from and on), long before /-ŋ/ in verbs (belong) and adjectives (wrong), and short in nouns (song).

FOOT

- The FOOT vowel /ʊ/ is close-mid (close to [ɵ]), and may become centralised, even when stressed, so words like good /ɡʊd/ are pronounced closer to [ɡəd], and could and kid may sound the same, [kʰəd].

Changes before /l/

- Before /l/, /ʉː/ is retracted to [uː], and /e/ is lowered to [ɛ] (see salary–celery merger), yielding a merger with TRAP. These changes make words like too [tʰʉː] sound different from tool [tʰuːl] and leads to Ellen and Alan both being pronounced /ˈɛlən/. Mergers before /l/ may occur between /iː/ and /iə̯/ (as in reel /ɹiːl/ vs real /ɹiə̯l/, the only minimal pair) and /ʊ/ and /ʉː/ (pull /pʊl/ vs pool /pʉːl/).

Māori English

- Māori English has a more fronted and lowered DRESS vowel.
- The KIT vowel is less central, and is used in unstressed syllables where schwa would be expected (due to the merger of KIT and schwa).
- The THOUGHT vowel is lowered compared to General New Zealand English.
- The GOOSE vowel may be more fronted in Māori English.
- The NURSE vowel may be more rounded and more fronted.

Pasifika English

- Features identified as being part of a unique Pasifika English sociolect include a raised KIT vowel, reduced diphthonisation of GOOSE and FLEECE, a lowered DRESS, and for some a retracted and lowered TRAP.

=== Diphthongs ===
Part 1 of New Zealand English closing diphthongs, from Bauer et al. (2007:99). [ɒʊ] represents the phonetic outcome of a neutralization of the non-prevocalic sequences /ɒl/ and /aʉ̯l/.

Part 2 of New Zealand English closing diphthongs, from Bauer et al. (2007:99).

Centring diphthongs of New Zealand English, from Bauer et al. (2007:99). The speaker in question does not differentiate between /iə̯/ and /eə̯/.

Diphthongs
Closing	æɪ̯ aɪ̯ oɪ̯ æʊ̯ aʉ̯
Centring	iə̯ (eə̯) ʉə̯

Phonetic quality

- On the Cultivated end of the spectrum, the starting points of the fronting-closing diphthongs /æɪ̯/ and /aɪ̯/ are front [æɪ̯] in the first case and central [äɪ̯] or advanced back [ɑ̟ɪ] (both hereafter written with ⟨aɪ̯⟩) in the second case. These are the usual NZE realizations. On the Broad end of the spectrum, they are both retracted, so that /æɪ̯/ acquires a central onset [äɪ̯], whereas the first element of /aɪ̯/ is retracted and rounded to [ɒɪ], sometimes with raising to [ɔɪ] (both hereafter written with ⟨ɒɪ⟩), approaching the CHOICE vowel /oɪ̯/ but without an actual merger. This means that the diphthong [aɪ̯] can stand for either vowel, depending on the variety of NZE. However, unlike the front vowel shift, rounded variants of PRICE are stigmatised, and younger female speakers tend to opt for the conservative variants of those diphthongs even when they exhibit the most advanced variety of the front vowel shift, which leads to the white rabbit [ˌhwaɪ̯t ˈɹɛ̝bət] phenomenon (note the Cultivated [aɪ̯] but Broad [ɛ̝]).
- The ending points of FACE /æɪ̯/, PRICE /aɪ̯/ and CHOICE /oɪ̯/ vary between close-mid front [e] and close front [i]. In Cultivated NZE, FACE [æe̝] consistently has a higher offset than PRICE [ae̯], much like in General Australian English, but in Broad NZE they normally have the same ending point [e]: [ae̯, ɒe̯]. In General NZE, they have been reported to differ as [æe̯] (with a close-mid ending point) vs. [ae̞̯] (with a mid ending point) by one source. Elsewhere in the article, the offsets of the fronting diphthongs are written with ⟨ɪ⟩ regardless of their precise height, following the way they are usually transcribed in English.
- The onset of /æʊ̯/ is normally raised open front, [æ], whereas its ending point varies between the close back [ʊ] and the close central [ʉ]. Unlike in Australian English, the open-mid back ending point [ɔ] does not occur. In Broad NZE, the starting point is higher, giving [ɛ] or [ɛ̝], whereas the offset is centralized and unrounded to [ə], effectively turning MOUTH into a centring diphthong that encroaches on the Cultivated realization of SQUARE. This [ɛə] realization is gaining ground among younger speakers of the General variety. The Cultivated realization is [äʊ̯] (hereafter written without the diacritic), a glide from the open central position to the close back position, which differs from the General NZE GOAT /aʉ̯/ only by the backness of the second element. According to one source, [aʊ̯] is sometimes also used in General NZE, though more commonly with a somewhat more front onset: [æ̠ʊ̯]. The raised [æ] onset has been present since at least 1900.
- The starting point of /aʉ̯/ is [ä], whereas its ending point is close to cardinal [ʉ], making it a glide from STRUT to GOOSE. In certain phonetic environments (especially in tonic syllables and in the word no), some speakers unround it to [ɨ], sometimes with additional fronting to [ɪ], making no sound like nigh. In the Cultivated variety, the onset is mid central and rounded, whereas the ending point is more back: [ɵ̞ʊ̯].
- The starting points of /iə̯/ and /eə̯/ are identical ([ɪ]) in contemporary NZE. However, conservative speakers distinguish the two diphthongs as [ɪə̯] and [e̞ə̯].
- Sources do not agree on the exact phonetic realizations of certain NZE diphthongs:
  - The onset of /oɪ̯/ has been variously described as close-mid back [o] and mid near-back [ö̞], both overlapping with the allophonic range of THOUGHT /oː/.
  - The starting point of /ʉə̯/ has been variously described as near-close central [ʉ̞] and near-close near-back [ʊ].

CURE

- The CURE diphthong /ʉə̯/ (as in "tour") is becoming rarer, and tends to be found only following /j/. Most speakers use either /ʉːə/ or /oː/ instead.

NEAR–SQUARE merger

- The NEAR–SQUARE merger (of the diphthongs /iə̯/ and /eə̯/) is on the increase, especially since the beginning of the 21st century so that the phrase that's neither here nor there is pronounced [ˈðɛts niːða ˈhiə̯ noː ˈðiə̯] in General NZE, with here rhyming with there. In Cultivated NZE, the distinction is maintained: [ˈðæts niːða ˈhiə̯ noː ˈðeə̯]. Similarly, beer and bear as well as really and rarely are homophones: [biə̯], [ˈɹiə̯liː]. There is some debate as to the quality of the merged vowel, but the consensus appears to be that it is towards a close variant, [iə̯]. The proportion of teenagers showing the merger increased from 16% in 1983 to 80% in 1999. The merger is nearly complete, with most younger speakers being unable to tell the two diphthongs apart. As the merger is not yet fully complete, it is transcribed only in phonetic transcription, whereas in phonemic transcription the distinction is maintained: /ˈðɛts niːða ˈhiə̯ noː ˈðeə̯/, etc.

Changes before /l/

- Before /l/, /aʉ̯/ becomes [ɒʊ̯], making go [ɡaʉ̯] sound different to goal [ɡɒʊ̯ɫ]. This vowel change may lead to a merger with LOT (/ɒ/) (doll [dɒɫ] vs dole [dɒʊ̯ɫ]), especially when the /l/ is vocalised. This has been labelled the GOLD lexical set by Bauer et al. (2007:98).

=== Transcriptions ===
Sources differ in the way they transcribe New Zealand English. The differences are listed below. The traditional phonemic orthography for the Received Pronunciation as well as the reformed phonemic orthographies for Australian and General South African English have been added for the sake of comparison.

Transcription systems
New Zealand English					Australian	South African	RP	Example words
This article	Wells 1982	Bauer et al 2007	Hay et al 2008	Rogers 2014	Australian	South African	RP	Example words
iː	iː	iː	i	ɨj	iː	iː	iː	fleece
iː	iː	i	i	i	iː	iː	i	happy, video
ə	ə	ɘ	ɪ	ə	ɪ	ə	ɪ	ring, writing
ə	ə	ɘ	ɪ	ə	ɪ	ə	ɪ	kit
ə	ə	ɘ	ə	ə	ə	ə	ɪ	rabbit
ə	ə	ɘ	ə	ə	ə	ə	ə	accept, abbot
ə	ə	ɘ	ə	ə	ə	ə	ə	sofa, better
a	ʌ	ɐ	ʌ	ʌ	ɐ	ʌ	ʌ	strut, unknown
aː	aː	ɐː	a	a	ɐː	ɑː	ɑː	palm, start
iə̯	iə̯	iə̯	iə̯	ɪə̯	ɪə̯	ɪə̯	ɪə̯	near
ʊ	ʊ	ʊ	ʊ	ʊ	ʊ	ʊ	ʊ	foot
ʉː	uː / yː	ʉː	u	ʉ	ʉː	ʉː	uː	goose
ʉə̯	ʊə̯	ʉə̯	ʊə̯	ʊə̯	ʉːə	ʊə̯	ʊə̯	cure
ʉə̯	ʊə̯	ʉə̯	ʊə̯	ʊə̯	ʉː	ʊə̯	ʊə̯	fury
oː	ɔː / oː	ʉə̯	ʊə̯	ʊə̯	oː	ʊə̯	ʊə̯	sure
oː	ɔː / oː	oː	ɔ	ɔ	oː	oː	ɔː	thought, north
e	e	e	e	e	e	e	e	dress
øː	ɜː / øː	ɵː	ɜ	ɞ	ɜː	øː	ɜː	nurse
ɛ	æ	ɛ	æ	ɛ	æ	æ	æ	trap
ɒ	ɒ	ɒ	ɒ	ɒ	ɔ	ɒ	ɒ	lot
æɪ̯	ʌɪ̯	æe̯	ei̯	ʌj	æɪ̯	eɪ̯	eɪ̯	face
eə̯	eə̯ / eː	eə̯	eə̯	eə̯	eː	eː	ɛː	square
aʉ̯	ʌʊ̯	ɐʉ̯	oʊ̯	ʌw	əʉ̯	əʊ̯	əʊ̯	goat
oɪ̯	ɔɪ̯	oe̯	ɔi̯	ɔj	oɪ̯	ɔɪ̯	ɔɪ̯	choice
aɪ̯	ɑɪ̯	ɑe̯	ai̯	ɑj	ɑe̯	aɪ̯	aɪ̯	price
æʊ̯	æʊ̯	æo̯	aʊ̯	æw	æɔ̯	aʊ̯	aʊ̯	mouth

== Consonants ==
New Zealand English consonants are consistent with those from those found in other varieties of English, such as Received Pronunciation.

New Zealand English consonant phonemes
	Labial	Dental	Alveolar	Post- alveolar	Palatal	Velar	Glottal
Nasal	m		n			ŋ	
Plosive	p b		t d			k ɡ	
Affricate				t͡ʃ d͡ʒ			
Fricative	f v	θ ð	s z	ʃ ʒ			h
Approximant			l	ɹ	j	w	

Non-rhoticity

- New Zealand English is non-rhotic (with linking and intrusive R), except for speakers with the so-called Southland burr, a semi-rhotic, Scottish-influenced dialect heard principally in Southland and parts of Otago. Older Southland speakers sound the [ɹ] variably after vowels, but today younger speakers use [ɹ] only with the NURSE vowel and occasionally with the LETTER vowel. Younger Southland speakers pronounce [ɹ] in third term [ˌθøːɹd ˈtøːɹm] (General NZE pronunciation: [ˌθøːd ˈtøːm]) but not in farm cart /ˈfaːm kaːt/ (same as in General NZE). Among r-less speakers, however, non-prevocalic [ɹ] is sometimes pronounced in a few words, including Ireland [ˈaɪ̯(ə)ɹɫənd], merely [ˈmiə̯ɹɫiː], err [øːɹ], and the name of the letter R [aːɹ] (General NZE pronunciations: [ˈaɪ̯ə̯ɫənd, ˈmiə̯ɫiː, øː, aː]). Some Māori speakers are semi-rhotic, although it is not clearly identified to any particular region or attributed to any defined language shift. The Māori language itself tends in most cases to use an r with an alveolar tap [ɾ], like Scottish dialect.

Pronunciation of /l/

- /l/ is velarised ("dark") [ɫ] in almost all positions, and is often vocalised to some sort of near close back vowel in syllable codas, so that ball is pronounced as [boːɯ̯ ~ boːʊ̯ ~ boːɵ̯]. Even when not vocalised, it is darker in codas than in onsets, possibly with pharyngealisation. Vocalisation varies in different regions and between different socioeconomic groups; the younger, lower social class speakers vocalise /l/ most of the time.

Pronunciation of ⟨wh⟩

- The traditional distinction between the /w/ and /hw/ phonemes no longer exists for most speakers. It is mostly only older speakers who retain a distinction between wine and whine. All speakers are more likely to retain it in lexical words than in grammatical words, therefore even older speakers have a variable merger here.

Flapped /t/ and /d/

- As with Australian English and American English, the intervocalic /t/ and /d/ may be a flapped [ɾ], so that the sentence "use a little bit of butter" may be pronounced [jʉːz ɐ ˈɫəɾɯ bəɾ‿əv ˈbɐɾɐ]. Evidence for this usage exists as far back as the early 19th century, such as Kerikeri being transliterated as "Kiddee Kiddee" by missionaries. In addition, in more careful speech /t/ may be realised as a fricative rather than a plosive, such as in words like city.

Glottal reinforcement

- There is an increasing tendency for syllable-final plosives (/t/ and to a lesser extent /p, k/) to be either reinforced or replaced with a glottal stop.

Pronunciation of /hj/

- Like other accents, pronunciation of syllable-onset /hj/ may be realised as [ç].

Retraction of /s/

- The /s/ at the beginning of consonant clusters, typically /stɹ/ and /stj/, may instead be pronounced as /ʃ/, making words like student and stupid pronounced [ˈʃtʃʉːdənt] and [ˈʃtʃʉːpəd] respectively.

Yod-dropping

- The dropping of /j/ is uncommon but variable, and occurs more regularly in the word new [nʉː]. The yod is sometimes also dropped in debut, hence [dæɪ̯ˈbʉː].

Pronunciation of ⟨th⟩

- A relatively recent phenomenon is ⟨th⟩ fronting, where interdental /θ, ð/ are realised as labiodental [f, v]. This feature was not present in New Zealand English until the end of the 20th century. A 2003 analysis found that word-final ⟨th⟩ sounds are fronted roughly half the time, with the word with being fronted more commonly than other words, and ⟨th⟩ sounds in other places are fronted around a quarter of the time. This realisation is not consistent even within the same sentence. ⟨th⟩ fronting is also common in Pasifika English, and may be instead stopped, producing [t, d] for /θ, ð/.
- In Pasifika English, /θ, ð/ may be realised as stops [t, d] as well as the aforementioned [f, v].

== Other features ==
- Some New Zealanders pronounce past participles such as grown /ˈɡɹaʉ̯ən/, thrown /ˈθɹaʉ̯ən/ and mown /ˈmaʉ̯ən/ with two syllables, the latter containing a schwa /ə/ not found in other accents. By contrast, groan /ɡɹaʉ̯n/, throne /θɹaʉ̯n/ and moan /maʉ̯n/ are all unaffected, meaning these word pairs can be distinguished by ear.
- The trans- prefix is usually pronounced /tɹɛns/; this produces mixed pronunciation of the letter A in words like transplant /ˈtɹɛnsplaːnt/. However, /tɹaːns/ is also heard, typically in older New Zealanders.
- The name of the letter H is almost always /æɪ̯tʃ/, as in North American, and is almost never aspirated (/hæɪ̯tʃ/).
- The name of the letter Z is usually the British, Canadian and Australian zed /zed/. Likewise, the initials of the country (N.Z.) are always "en zed". However the alphabet song for children is sometimes sung ending with /ziː/ in accordance with the rhyme. Where Z is universally pronounced zee in places, names, terms, or titles, such as ZZ Top, LZ (landing zone), Jay Z (celebrity), or Z Nation (TV show) New Zealanders follow universal pronunciation.
- The word foyer is usually pronounced /ˈfoɪ̯.ə/, as in Australian and American English, rather than /ˈfoɪ̯.æɪ̯/ as in British English.
- The word and combining form graph is pronounced both /ɡɹaːf/ and /ɡɹɛf/.
- The word data is commonly pronounced /ˈdaːtə/, with /ˈdæɪ̯tə/ being the second most common, and /ˈdɛtə/ being very rare.

== Pronunciation of Māori place names ==
The pronunciations of many Māori place names were anglicised for most of the nineteenth and twentieth centuries, but since the 1980s increased consciousness of the Māori language has led to a shift towards using a Māori pronunciation. The anglicisations have persisted most among residents of the towns in question, so it has become something of a shibboleth, with correct Māori pronunciation marking someone as non-local.

Examples
Placename	English pronunciation	Māori pronunciation
Cape Reinga	/ˌkæɪ̯p ɹiːˈɛŋə/	[ˈɾeːiŋɐ]
Hāwera	/ˈhaːweɹa, -wəɹ-, -aː/	[ˈhɑːwɛɾɐ]
Ōakura	/ˈɒkɹə/	[ˈoːɐˌkʉɾɐ]
Ōtāhuhu	/ˌaʉ̯təˈhʉːhʉː/	[oːˈtɑːhʉhʉ]
Ōtorohanga	/ˌaʉ̯tɹəˈhaŋa, -ˈhɒŋə/	[ˈoːtɔɾɔhɐŋɐ]
Paraparaumu	/ˈpɛɹəpɹɛm/, /ˌpɛɹəpɛˈɹæʊ̯mʉː/	[pɐɾɐpɐˈɾɐʉmʉ]
Pāuatahanui	/ˌpaːtəˈnʉ.iː/, /ˈpæʊ̯ətaːhənʉːi/	[ˈpɐːʉɐtɐhɐnʉi]
Taumarunui	/ˌtæʊ̯məɹəˈnʉːiː/	[ˈtɐʉ̯mɐɾʉnʉi]
Te Awamutu	/ˌtiː əˈmʉːtʉː/	[tɛ ɐwɐˈmʉtʉ]
Te Kauwhata	/ˌtiː kəˈwɒtə/	[tɛ ˈkɐʉ̯fɐtɐ]
Waikouaiti	/ˈwɛkəwaɪ̯t, -wɒt/	[ˈwɐikɔʉˌɐiti]
Taranaki	/ˈtɛɹanɛki/	[ˈtɐɾɐnɐki]

Some anglicised names are colloquially shortened, for example, Coke /kaʉ̯k/ for Kohukohu, the Rapa /ˈɹɛpə/ for the Wairarapa, Kura /ˈkʉə̯ɹə/ for Papakura, Papatoe /ˈpɛpətaʉ̯iː/ for Papatoetoe, Otahu /ˌaʉ̯təˈhʉː/ for Otahuhu, Paraparam /ˈpɛɹəpɛɹɛm/ or Pram /pɹɛm/ for Paraparaumu, the Naki /ˈnɛkiː/ for Taranaki, Cow-cop /ˈkæʊ̯kɒp/ for Kaukapakapa and Pie-cock /ˈpaɪ̯kɒk/ for Paekakariki.

There is some confusion between these shortenings, especially in the southern South Island, and the natural variations of the southern dialect of Māori. Not only does this dialect sometimes feature apocope, but consonants also vary slightly from standard Māori. To compound matters, names were often initially transcribed by Scottish settlers, rather than the predominantly English settlers of other parts of the country; as such further alterations are not uncommon. Thus, while Lake Wakatipu is sometimes referred to as Wakatip /ˈwɒkətəp/, Oamaru as Om-a-roo /ˌɒməˈɹʉː/ and Waiwera South as Wy-vra /ˈwaɪ̯vɹə/, these differences may be as much caused by dialect differences – either in Māori or in the English used during transcription – as by the process of anglicisation. An extreme example is The Kilmog /ˈkəlmɒɡ/, the name of which is cognate with the standard Māori Kirimoko.

== See also ==
- Australian English phonology
- South African English phonology
- Regional accents of English

== Bibliography ==
- Bauer, Laurie; Warren, Paul (2004), "New Zealand English: phonology", in Schneider, Edgar W.; Burridge, Kate; Kortmann, Bernd; Mesthrie, Rajend; Upton, Clive (eds.), A handbook of varieties of English, vol. 1: Phonology, Mouton de Gruyter, pp. 580–602, ISBN 3-11-017532-0
- Bauer, Laurie; Warren, Paul; Bardsley, Dianne; Kennedy, Marianna; Major, George (2007), "New Zealand English", Journal of the International Phonetic Association, 37 (1): 97–102, doi:10.1017/S0025100306002830
- Cox, Felicity; Fletcher, Janet (2017) [First published 2012], Australian English Pronunciation and Transcription (2nd ed.), Cambridge University Press, ISBN 978-1-316-63926-9
- Crystal, David (2003), The Cambridge encyclopedia of the English language (2nd ed.), Cambridge University Press
- Gordon, Elizabeth; Maclagan, Margaret (2004), "Regional and social differences in New Zealand: phonology", in Schneider, Edgar W.; Burridge, Kate; Kortmann, Bernd; Mesthrie, Rajend; Upton, Clive (eds.), A handbook of varieties of English, vol. 1: Phonology, Mouton de Gruyter, pp. 603–613, ISBN 3-11-017532-0
- Gordon, Elizabeth; Campbell, Lyle; Hay, Jennifer; Maclagan, Margaret; Sudbury, Peter; Trudgill, Andrea, eds. (2004), New Zealand English: Its Origins and Evolution, Cambridge: Cambridge University Press
- Hay, Jennifer; Maclagan, Margaret; Gordon, Elizabeth (2008), New Zealand English, Dialects of English, Edinburgh University Press, ISBN 978-0-7486-2529-1
- Nikolenko, A.G., English Lexicology - theory and practice, Нова Книга, ISBN 9789663820767
- Roca, Iggy; Johnson, Wyn (1999), A Course in Phonology, Blackwell Publishing
- Rogers, Henry (2014) [First published 2000], The Sounds of Language: An Introduction to Phonetics, Essex: Routledge, ISBN 978-0-582-38182-7
- Trudgill, Peter; Hannah, Jean (2008), International English: A Guide to the Varieties of Standard English (5th ed.), London: Arnold
- Wells, John C. (1982). Accents of English. Vol. 3: Beyond the British Isles (pp. i–xx, 467–674). Cambridge University Press. doi:10.1017/CBO9780511611766. ISBN 0-52128541-0.
