= Maastrichtian dialect phonology =

Phonology of Maastrichtian Limburgish

The phonology of the Maastrichtian dialect, especially with regard to vowels is quite extensive due to the dialect's tonal nature.

== Consonants ==
Maastrichtian consonants
		Labial	Alveolar	Palatal	Velar	Uvular	Glottal
Nasal		m	n	(ɲ)	ŋ		
Plosive	voiceless	p	t	(tʃ)	k		(ʔ)
Plosive	voiced	b	d		ɡ		
Fricative	voiceless	f	s	(ʃ)	x		
Fricative	voiced	v	z	(ʒ)	ɣ		ɦ
Liquid			l			ʀ	
Approximant		w		j			

- /m, p, b/ are bilabial, whereas /f, v/ are labiodental.
- /w/ is realized as a bilabial approximant [β̞] in the onset and as labio-velar [w] in the coda. In this article, both are transcribed with ⟨w⟩, following the recommendations of Carlos Gussenhoven regarding transcribing the corresponding Standard Dutch phone.
- Voiceless plosives are unaspirated, whereas the voiced plosives are fully voiced.
- Word-initial /v/ and especially /ɣ/ can be only partially voiced [v̥, ɣ̊] but without merging with, respectively, /f/ and /x/.
- /ɣ, x/ are palatal [ʝ, ç] before or after front vowels.
- [ɲ, tʃ, ʃ, ʒ] are laminal postalveolar. Phonemically, they can be analysed as /nj, tj, sj, zj/.
- Word-initial /x/ is restricted to loanwords.
- /ʀ/ is a voiced fricative trill, with the fricative component varying between uvular [ʁ͡ʀ] and post-velar [ɣ̠͡ʀ]. The fricative component is particularly audible in the syllable coda, where a partial devoicing to [χ͡ʀ̥ ~ x̠͡ʀ̥] also occurs.
- A non-phonemic glottal stop [ʔ] is inserted between a syllable-final [ə] and the following vowel.
- Final clusters of /l/ and /ʀ/ followed by /m, p, k, f, x/ and, in the case of /ʀ/ alone, /n/ are all separated by a schwa, adding an extra syllable: sjolk /ˈʃɔlk/ → [ˈʃɔlək] 'apron'. The extra syllable is not shown in the orthography.

Example words for consonants
Voiceless				Voiced			
Sound	IPA	Orthography	Meaning	Sound	IPA	Orthography	Meaning
				[m]	[ˈmiw]	miew	'gull'
				[n]	[ˈnœj]	nui	'new'
				[ɲ]	[koˈɲɑk]	cógnac	'brandy'
				[ŋ]	[ˈeŋ]	ing	'scary'
[p]	[ˈpʀiːs]	pries	'price'	[b]	[ˈbʀoːʀ]	broor	'brother'
[t]	[ˈtiːt]	tied	'time'	[d]	[ˈdaːk]	daak	'roof'
[tʃ]	[ˈbɑtʃɑkəʀ]	batjakker	'rascal'				
[k]	[ˈklɒːʀ]	klaor	'ready'	[ɡ]	[ˈlɛɡə]	lègke	'lay'
[f]	[ˈfiːn]	fien	'fine'	[v]	[ˈvaːn]	vaan	'of'
[s]	[ˈɑs]	as	'ash'	[z]	[ˈziː]	zie	'sea'
[ʃ]	[ˈʃeːp]	sjeep	'schip'	[ʒ]	[ʒywəˈleːʀ]	zjuweleer	'jeweller'
[x]	[ˈɔwx]	ouch	'also'	[ɣ]	[ˈɣoːt]	good	'good'
				[ɦ]	[ˈɦɛj]	hei	'here'
				[ʀ]	[ˈʀoːnt]	roond	'round'
				[w]	[ˈwiːn]	wien	'whine'
				[l]	[ˈleŋks]	links	'left'
				[j]	[ˈjɒː]	jao	'yes'

== Vowels ==
Monophthongs of the Maastrichtian dialect, from Gussenhoven & Aarts (1999:159)

Phonological diphthongs of the Maastrichtian dialect, from Gussenhoven & Aarts (1999:159)

Maastrichtian vowels (vowel space)
	Front				Central	Back	
	unrounded		rounded		Central	Back	
	short	long	short	long	short	short	long
Close	i	iː	y	yː		u	uː
Close-mid	e	eː	ø	øː	ə	o	oː
Open-mid	ɛ	ɛː	œ	(œː)	ə	ɔ	(ɔː)
Open	æ	aː		ɶː		ɑ	ɒː
Diphthongs	ɛj œj ɔw						

- The vowel phonemes of Maastrichtian Limburgish can be categorized as short lax /e, ø, o, ɛ, œ, ɔ, æ, ɑ/, short tense /i, y, u/, long lax /ɛː, ɶː, ɒː/, long tense /iː, yː, uː, eː, øː, oː, aː/, diphthongal /ɛj, œj, ɔw/ and the unstressed-only /ə/.
- /ɛj, œj, ɔw/ are phonological diphthongs, akin to Standard Dutch /ɛi, œy, ɔu/ (which is how Gussenhoven & Aarts (1999) transcribe the Maastrichtian sounds). They are diphthongal [ɛj, œj, ɔw] when combined with Accent 1 and monophthongal [ɛː, œː, ɔː] when combined with Accent 2. In this article, the short vowel+glide transcription ⟨ɛj, œj, ɔw⟩ akin to that found in the Mestreechter Taol dictionary is used because the ending points of especially [ɛj] and [ɔw] are exactly like those of the phonological vowel+glide sequences [æj, ɑj, iw, æw, ɑw]. The difference between [ɛj] and [æj] as well as [ɔw] and [ɑw] lies purely in the openness of the first element (and its rounding, in the case of the latter pair). Thus, the ending points of [ɛj, œj, ɔw] are all closer than in Standard Dutch.
- /ɛː/ (the vowel usually spelled with ⟨ae⟩ in Limburgish) has mostly merged with /eː/ under the influence of Standard Dutch. A phonemic /ɛː/ appears in French loanwords such as tête /ˈtɛːt/ 'brawn'. Most phonetic instances of [ɛː] in the dialect are monophthongized /ɛj/. Gussenhoven & Aarts (1999) claim that there is a phonetic difference between the two (with the phonetic realization of /ɛː/ being more open [æː]), yet the Mestreechter Taol dictionary (written, among others, by Aarts) does not make such a distinction; instead, ⟨æː⟩ is used for the /æ/ phoneme combined with Accent 2. In this article, the difference between [ɛː] stemming from /ɛː/ and the one stemming from /ɛj/ is not transcribed.
- The open-mid front [ɛː] is diphthongized to [ɛj] in words with Accent 2 only when it is a realization of the underlying /ɛj/. The underlying /ɛː/ does not participate in tonal distinction.
- The open-mid [œː, ɔː] contrast not only with the close-mid [øː, oː] but also with the open [ɶː, ɒː] in (near)-minimal pairs such as eus [ˈøːs] 'ours' vs. struis [ˈstʀœːs˦] vs. käös [ˈkɶːs] 'choice'. In the verb koume 'to come', the height difference between [ɔː] and [ɒː] is the only difference between the first and third person plural present indicative form koume [ˈkɔː˦mə] '(we/they) come' (homophonous with the infinitive) and the corresponding preterite form kaome [ˈkɒː˦mə] '(we/they) came'.
- As in other Limburgish dialects, the phonological open-mid series (the long counterparts of the /ɛ, œ, ɔ/) is the long lax series /ɛː, ɶː, ɒː/ (note than in other dialects, the latter two vowels are usually transcribed with ⟨œː⟩ and ⟨ɔː⟩. Here, ⟨ɶː⟩ and ⟨ɒː⟩ are used instead so that they are strongly distinguished from the monophthongized /œj/ and /ɔw/ in phonetic transcription). /aː/ is the sole long open vowel as far as the phonology is concerned. [ɶː, ɒː] are grouped together with [aː] in the table for the sake of simplicity and phonetic accuracy ([ɛː, œː, ɔː] is the actual phonetic open-mid series).
- /aː/ is a phonological open back vowel as it umlauts to /ɶː/, /eː/ or /æ/.

Taking all of that into consideration, the vocalic phonemes of Maastrichtian can be classified much like those found in other Limburgish dialects:

Maastrichtian vowels (phonemic classification)
	Front				Central	Back	
	unrounded		rounded		Central	Back	
	short	long	short	long	short	short	long
Close	i	iː	y	yː		u	uː
Close-mid	e	eː	ø	øː	ə	o	oː
Open-mid	ɛ	(ɛː)	œ	ɶː	ə	ɔ	ɒː
Open	æ					ɑ	aː
Diphthongs	ɛj		œj			ɔw	

=== Phonetic realization ===
- /e, ø, o/ slightly more central [e̠, ɵ, o̟] than the corresponding tense vowels (though /øː/ itself is strongly centralized as well, being closer to [ɵː]); in addition, both /ø/ and /o/ are more weakly rounded than /øː/ and /oː/.
- The long close-mid monophthongs /eː, øː, oː/ have a very similar allophonic variation to /ɛj, œj, ɔw/: they are monophthongal [eː, øː, oː] when combined with Accent 2. When combined with Accent 1, they are realized as narrow diphthongs [eɪ, øʏ, oʊ], especially in the word-final position. The offsets of those diphthongs never reach the fully close position of [i, y, u]. Because of that, this slight allophonic variation is ignored elsewhere in the article.
- Among the front rounded vowels, all but /œ/ are central. In addition, /ɶː/ is near-open and the offset of [œj] is central and rounded: [ʉ, ʉː, ɵ, ɵː, ɞː, ɐ̹ː, ɞw̟]. The diphthongal allophone of /øː/ (transcribed broadly with ⟨øː⟩ in this article) is also central: [ɵʊ̈]. /œ/ is mid front [œ̝]. In the rest of the article, they are transcribed with the simple symbols ⟨y, yː, øː, œː, ɶː, œj, œ⟩, not least because they are phonologically front, as they are the umlauted versions of the corresponding back vowels ([ɔw] in the case of [œj]).
- In the case of the [œː–ɶː] and [ɔː–ɒː] pairs, the biggest height difference is between [ɔː] and [ɒː]. The remaining [œː–ɶː] pair is more similar, so that [ɶː] could be transcribed [œ̞ː] (or [ɞ̞ː], capturing its centrality) in narrow transcription.
- [œː, ɔː] are in free variation with weakly diphthongal [œːø̆, ɔːŏ] (with [œːø̆] being central [ɞːʉ̞̆] like [œː] and [ø]) that glide towards the close-mid [ø, o], rather than the close [y, u]. The offsets of [œːø̆, ɔːŏ] are less prominent than those of [œj, ɔw], which means that they sound as something in-between purely monophthongal [œː, ɔː] and the Accent 1 diphthongs [œj, ɔw]. When it is a realization of the underlying /ɛj/ (/ɛː/ is toneless), [ɛː] too can be diphthongized to [ɛːĕ] (again, with an offset that is less prominent than that of [ɛj]) when combined with Accent 2. When combined with Accent 1, it is always diphthongal [ɛj]. This variation is not shown in transcriptions in this article, and [œː, ɔː, ɛː] are consistently transcribed as monophthongs.
- [ɛ] is mid [ɛ̝].
- [æ] is near-open near-front [æ̠], whereas /aː/ is open near-front [a̠ː].
- Among the back vowels, /u, uː, o, ɔ, ɑ/ and [ɔː] (the monophthongal allophone of /ɔw/) are near-back; in addition, the latter is more open than the short /ɔ/, whereas /ɑ/ is closer than cardinal [ɑ]: [u̟, u̟ː, o̟, ɔ̟, ɔ̞̈ː, ɑ̽]. The remaining /oː/ and /ɒː/ are more peripheral (and /ɒː/ is also near-open): [oː, ɒ̝ː].
- The starting points of [ɛj, œj, ɔw] are all more open than the phonological short vowels /ɛ, œ, ɔ/, being open-mid front [ɛ] in the first case, open-mid central [ɞ] (rather than front, like /œ/) in the second case and somewhat lowered open-mid near-back [ɔ̞̈] in the last case. The first one has thus the quality that is in-between the short vowels /ɛ/ and /æ/, whereas the later two are in-between the short lax /œ, ɔ/ and their phonological long counterparts /ɶː, ɒː/. The monophthongal allophones of /ɛj, œj, ɔw/ are just elongated versions of the starting points of the corresponding diphthongs: [ɛː, ɞː, ɔ̞̈ː].

=== Vowel+glide sequences ===
The possible short vowel+glide sequences in the Maastrichtian dialect are /yj, uj, ɔj, æj, ɑj, iw, ɑw, æw/. The long vowel+glide sequences are /eːj, øːj, oːj, ɶːj, ɒːj, aːj/. The labial /w/ combines only with short vowels, whereas the palatal /j/ can be preceded by both short and long vowels. The sequences /eːj/ and /øːj/ contrast with diphthongal allophones of /eː/ and /øː/. Thus, beej [ˈbeːj] '(I) offer' does not rhyme with dee [ˈdeɪ] 'that (one)', nor does keuj [ˈkøːj] 'cows' rhyme with keu [ˈkøʏ] 'billiard cue'. These are among the subtlest phonetic distinctions in the dialect. The /eːj/ sequence stems mainly from /d/ vocalization, cf. Standard Dutch bied [bit], with a terminally devoiced ⟨d⟩.

As noted above, the distinction between diphthongs and vowel+glide sequences is not clear-cut. Among the phonological diphthongs, especially /ɛj/ and /ɔw/ combined with Accent 1 phonetically resemble the vowel+glide sequences. The difference between [ɛj] and [æj] as well as [ɔw] and [ɑw] lies purely in the quality of the first element. There is no *[ɶj] sequence to rival the diphthong [œj]. In that regard, Maastrichtian is much like the Weert dialect, in which the three phonemic closing diphthongs are also associated with vowel+glide sequences in words with Accent 1, although they begin more open in Weert: [æj, ɶj, ɑw]. This does lead to a merger with /æj/ (written /ɛj/ in IPA transcriptions of Weert Limburgish on Wikipedia) and /ɑw/, unlike in Maastricht. Furthermore, the term Accent 1 stands merely for a short vowel in Weert, with the vowel+glide sequences /ɛj, œj, ɑw/ being the shorter than the diphthongs /ɛɪ, œʏ, ʌʊ/.

Furthermore, /ɔw, ɑw/ (the first one combined with Accent 1) vary with /ɔj, ɑj/ with no evident social correlate. Thus, vojl 'dirty' can be pronounced as either /ˈvɔwl/ or /ˈvɔjl/, whereas gajdeef 'crook' can be pronounced as either /ˈɣɑwdeːf/ or /ˈɣɑjdeːf/.

=== Phonotactics ===
The phonotactics of Maastrichtian mirror those of Standard Dutch:

- /ə/ occurs only in unstressed syllables.
- The short lax vowels must be followed by a coda. A number of interjections (such as jó /ˈjo/ 'yes?') violate this rule.
- The short tense /i, y, u/ as well as the phonological diphthongs /ɛj, œj, ɔw/ are banned before coda /ʀ/.
- Before a final /ʀ/, the short lax vowels are rare.
- No contrast between the short /ɛ, ø, o/ and /æ, œ, ɔ/ exists before nasals, where the vowels can be identified as /æ, ø, ɔ/ (thus, in this one instance, Maastrichtian differs from Standard Dutch, in which the sole short mid back monophthong /ɔ/ is raised towards [o] before nasals). Minimal pairs can be found before obstruents and /l/.

== Stress and tone ==
Stress location is the same as in the Standard Dutch cognates. Main stress is regularly on the penultimate syllable. The intonational system is much like that of Standard Dutch and Standard German.

As many other Limburgish dialects, the Maastrichtian dialect features a distinction between Accent 1 and Accent 2, limited to stressed syllables. The former can be analyzed as lexically toneless, whereas the latter as an underlying high tone. Phonetically, syllables with Accent 2 are considerably longer. An example of a minimal pair is /ˈspøːlə/ 'to rinse' vs. /ˈspøː˦lə/ 'to play'. The difference is not marked in the orthography, so that both of those words are spelled speule.

Van Buuren claims that the difference lies only in length, and that there is no tonal contrast anywhere. However, research shows that there is a crucial difference between words like vuur /ˈvyːʀ˦/ 'fire' and those like broet /ˈbʀuːt/ 'bride', as words of the former type have the pitch features typical of Accent 2, whereas the latter do not. Despite that, the Mestreechter Taol dictionary transcribes it as a length distinction, with Accent 2 being transcribed as longer than Accent 1.

The distribution of the tonal contrast is rather erratic. It occurs in the following contexts:

- A short lax vowel followed by a sonorant other than /w/ and /j/ (excluding the phonological diphthongs /ɛj, œj, ɔw/);
- The tense vowels /eː, øː, oː, aː/, unless /j/ follows;
- The long tense /iː, yː, uː/ followed by coda /ʀ/;

This means that neither the short tense /i, y, u/ nor the long lax /ɛː, ɶː, ɒː/ participate in the tonal contrast, being toneless by default.

== Sample ==
The sample text is a reading of the first sentence of The North Wind and the Sun.

=== Phonetic transcription ===
[də ˈnoːʀ˦dəˌwent˦ æn də ˈzɔn ɦɑdən ən ˈdʀœkə desˈkøsi ˈøː˦vəʀ də ˈvʀɒːx | ˈweː vaːn ɦynən ˈtwijə də ˈstæʀ˦əkstə wɒːʀ | tun ˈʒys iːmɑnt vøːʀˈbɛː˦ kɒːm | deː nən ˈdekə ˈwæʀəmə ˈjɑs ˈɒːnɦɑt]

=== Orthographic version ===
De noordewind en de zon hadde 'n drökke discussie euver de vraog wee vaan hunen twieje de sterkste waor, toen zjuus iemand veurbij kaom dee 'nen dikke, werme jas aonhad.

== Bibliography ==
- Van Buuren, L. (July 1991). "A study of quantity in Mestreechs". York Papers in Linguistics (15): 251–280.
- Gussenhoven, Carlos (2007). "Wat is de beste transcriptie voor het Nederlands?" (PDF) (in Dutch). Nijmegen: Radboud University. Archived (PDF) from the original on 25 March 2017.
- Gussenhoven, Carlos; Aarts, Flor (1999), "The dialect of Maastricht" (PDF), Journal of the International Phonetic Association, 29 (2), University of Nijmegen, Centre for Language Studies: 155–166, doi:10.1017/S0025100300006526, archived from the original (PDF) on 2017-10-11
- Heijmans, Linda; Gussenhoven, Carlos (1998). "The Dutch dialect of Weert" (PDF). Journal of the International Phonetic Association. 28 (1–2): 107–112. doi:10.1017/S0025100300006307. Archived from the original (PDF) on 2014-06-06.
- Kristoffersen, Gjert (2000). The Phonology of Norwegian. Oxford University Press. ISBN 978-0-19-823765-5.
