= Bruges dialect =

West Flemish dialect used in Bruges

- Brugs
- Pronunciation: Standard Dutch: [ˈbrʏxs]; Bruges dialect: [ˈbrœhs]
- Region: Bruges
- Language family: Indo-European: Germanic; West Germanic; Istvaeonic; Low Franconian; Dutch; West Flemish; Bruges dialect

Language codes
- ISO 639-3: –
- Glottolog: None

The Bruges dialect (Standard Dutch and West Flemish: Brugs) is a West Flemish dialect used in Bruges. It is rapidly declining, being replaced by what scholars call general (rural) West Flemish.

== Phonology ==
=== Consonants ===
- After /u/, the sequence /nd/ is realized as a velar nasal [ŋ].
- The sequence /ən/ is realized as a sequence [ən], rather than a syllabic [n̩].

==== Realization of /r/ ====
According to Hinskens & Taeldeman (2013), /r/ is realized as a voiced uvular trill with little friction [ʀ̝]. In the neighbouring rural area, an alveolar [r] is used.

However, according to Sebregts (2014), the vast majority of the speakers in Bruges realize /r/ as alveolar, not uvular.

Definitely, the most common realization of /r/ is a voiced alveolar tap [ɾ], which is used about four times more often than the second most common realization, which is a voiced alveolar trill [r]. The other alveolar realizations include: a voiceless alveolar trill [r̥], a partially devoiced alveolar trill [r̥], a voiceless alveolar fricative tap/trill [ɾ̞̊ ~ r̝̊], a voiceless alveolar/postalveolar fricative [ɹ̝̊, ɹ̠̊˔] (the least common realization), a voiced alveolar/postalveolar fricative [ɹ̝ ~ ɹ̠˔] and a voiced alveolar approximant [ɹ].

Among the uvular realizations, he lists a voiced uvular trill [ʀ], a voiced uvular fricative trill [ʀ̝], a voiced uvular fricative [ʁ] and a voiced uvular approximant [ʁ̞], among which the uvular fricative trill is the most common realization. He also lists a central vowel (which probably means [ə], [ɐ] or both of these) and elision of /r/, both of which are very rare.

=== Vowels ===
Monophthongs of the Bruges dialect
	Front				Central	Back	
	unrounded		rounded		unrounded	Back	
	short	long	short	long	short	short	long
Close	ɪ		ʏ			ʊ	
Mid	ɛ	ɛː ɛ̃ː	œ	œː	ə	ɔ	ɔː
Open	æ	æː				ɑ	ɑː

- In comparison with Standard Dutch, the short front vowels underwent a chain shift, so that the standard /i, y, ɪ, ʏ, ɛ/ became /ɪ, ʏ, ɛ, œ, æ/. The standard /u/ was also lowered to /ʊ/, yet the standard /ɔ/ was left untouched.
- Among the back vowels, /ʊ, ɔ, ɔː/ are rounded, whereas /ɑ, ɑː/ are unrounded.
- /ɪ, ʏ, ʊ/ are near-close [ɪ̟, ʏ, ʊ̠]; /ɪ/ is fully front, whereas /ʊ/ is fully back.
- /ʏ, ʊ, œː/ (but not /œ, ɔ, ɔː/) are rather weakly rounded [ʏ̜, ʊ̜, œ̜ː].
- Phonetically, /ɛ, ə/ are mid [ɛ̝, ə], whereas /ɛː, ɛ̃ː, œ, œː, ɔ, ɔː/ are open-mid [ɛː, ɛ̃ː, œ, œː, ɔ, ɔː].
- Before /l/, /æ/ is lowered and retracted to [ɑ]. This feature is typical of working class speech and is nearly extinct.

Diphthongs of the Bruges dialect
	Ending point		
	Front	Central	Back
Close		iːə uːə	
Close-mid	eɪ øʏ	eːə	oʊ
Open-mid		ɔːə	ɔu

- All of the diphthongs are falling.
- /eɪ, øʏ, oʊ/ used to be pronounced as monophthongs [eː, øː, oː], a realization which is rapidly regaining popularity among younger speakers.
- Traditionally, /ɔu/ used to have such a close first element that there was practically no distinction between /ɔu/ and /oʊ/.
- Phonetically, /ɔːə/ can be either [ɔːə] or [ɔːɑ].

== Bibliography ==
- Hinskens, Frans; Taeldeman, Johan, eds. (2013), Dutch, Walter de Gruyter, ISBN 978-3-11-018005-3
- Sebregts, Koen (2014), "3.4.2 Bruges" (PDF), The Sociophonetics and Phonology of Dutch r, Utrecht: LOT, pp. 89–93, ISBN 978-94-6093-161-1
- Taeldeman, Johan (2005), "The influence of urban centres on the spatial diffusion of dialect phenomena", in Auer, Peter; Hinskens, Frans; Kerswill, Paul (eds.), Dialect Change: Convergence and Divergence in European Languages, Cambridge University Press, pp. 263–284, ISBN 0-521-80687-9
- Vandekerckhove, Reinhild (2010), "Urban and rural language", in Auer, Peter; Schmidt, Jürgen Erich (eds.), Language and Space: An International Handbook of Linguistic Variation. Theories and methods, Walter de Gruyter, pp. 315–332, ISBN 978-3-11-018002-2
