= Zaate Herremenie =

Carnival in Maastricht, the Netherlands

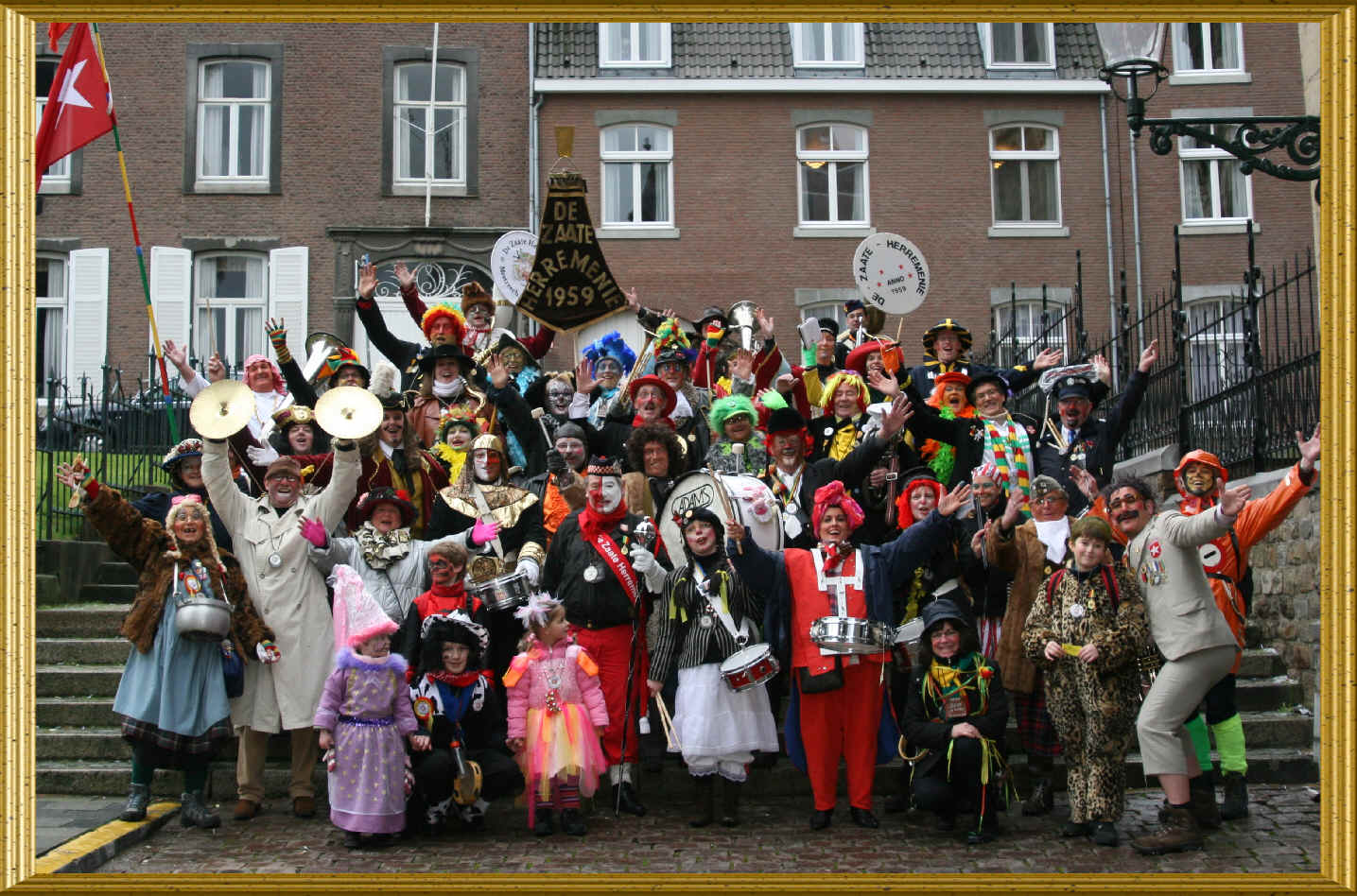
De Zaate Herremenie 1959 in 2008

The Zaate Herremenie (Limburgish (Maastrichtian variant) for: drunken orchestra) is a carnival that takes place in the city of Maastricht in the Netherlands.

== Modern history ==
In 1958, Dr John Hoenen introduced a group musicians to the parade, and a tradition of pushing a pram filled with beer. In 1959, this group was named "Zaate Herremenie" by the citizens of Maastricht. In the early 1960s the name was altered to "De Zaate Herremenie 1959".

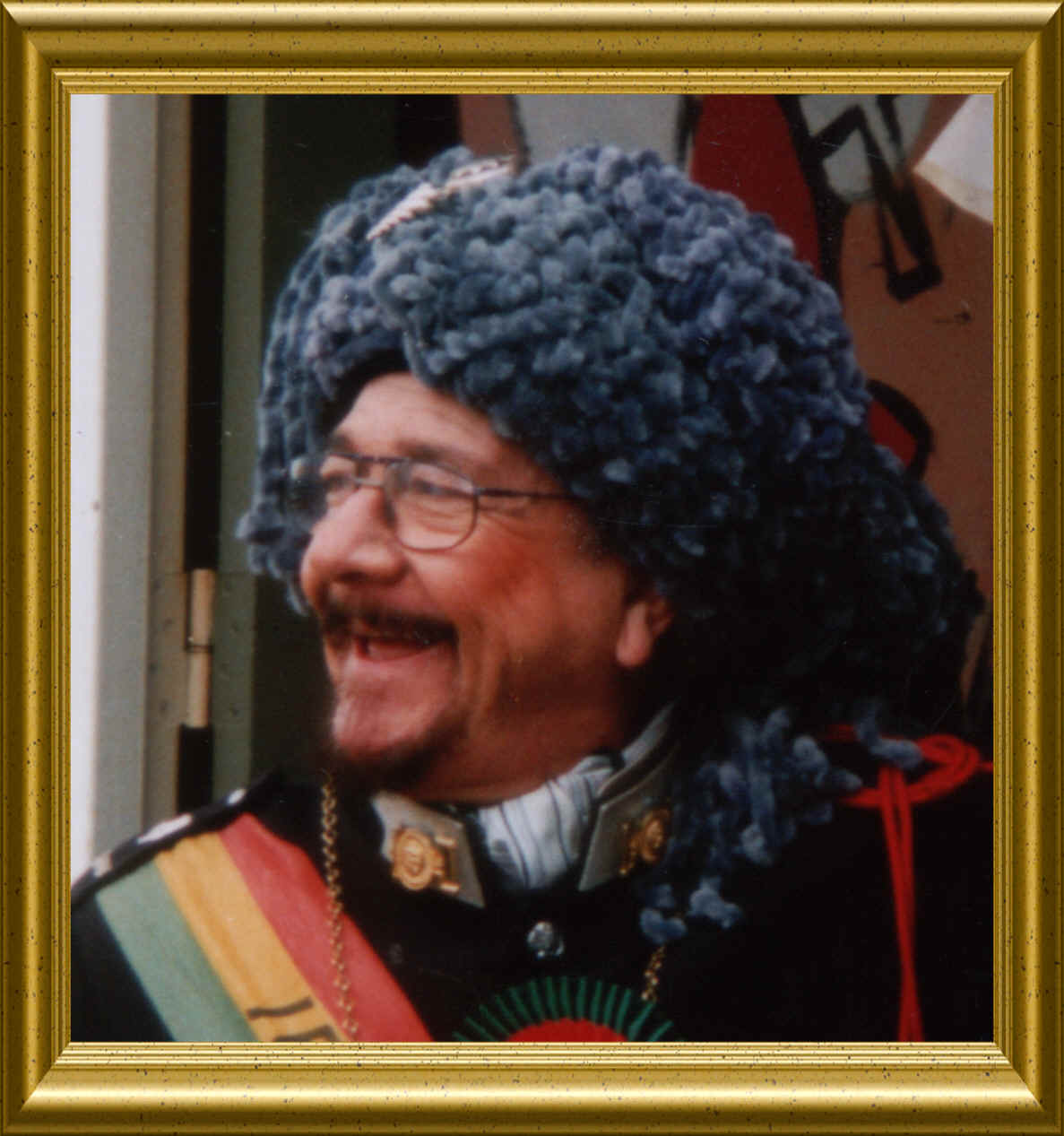
Dr John Hoenen

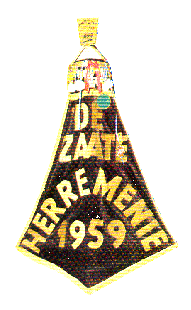
D'n Awwe Drappo

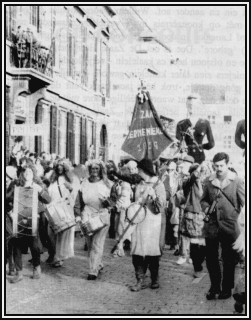
De Zaate Herremenie 1959 in 1964
