= Maastrichtian (disambiguation) =

The Maastrichtian is the last stage of the Cretaceous period, and therefore of the Mesozoic era.

Maastrichtian may also refer to:

- Pertaining to Maastricht, the capital city of Dutch Limburg
- Maastrichtian, the dialect of Limburgish spoken in Maastricht
