= Voiced uvular trill =

Consonantal sound represented by ⟨ʀ⟩ in IPA

ʀ
- IPA number: 123

Audio sample
- source · help

Encoding
- Entity (decimal): &#640;
- Unicode (hex): U+0280
- X-SAMPA: R\
- Braille: ⠔ (braille pattern dots-35) ⠗ (braille pattern dots-1235)
Image

A voiced uvular trill is a type of consonantal sound, used in some spoken languages. The symbol in the International Phonetic Alphabet that represents this sound is ⟨ʀ⟩, a small capital version of the Latin letter r. This consonant is one of several collectively called guttural R.

== Features ==
Features of a voiced uvular trill:

- Its manner of articulation is trill, which means it is produced by directing air over an articulator so that it vibrates. Unlike in tongue-tip trills, it is the uvula, not the tongue, that vibrates.
- Its place of articulation is uvular, which means it is articulated with the back of the tongue (the dorsum) at the uvula.
- Its phonation is voiced, which means the vocal cords vibrate during the articulation.
- It is an oral consonant, which means that air is not allowed to escape through the nose.
- It is a median consonant, which means it is produced by directing the airstream down the midline of the tongue, rather than to the sides.
- Its airstream mechanism is pulmonic, which means it is articulated by pushing air only with the intercostal muscles and abdominal muscles, as in most speech sounds.

== Occurrence ==
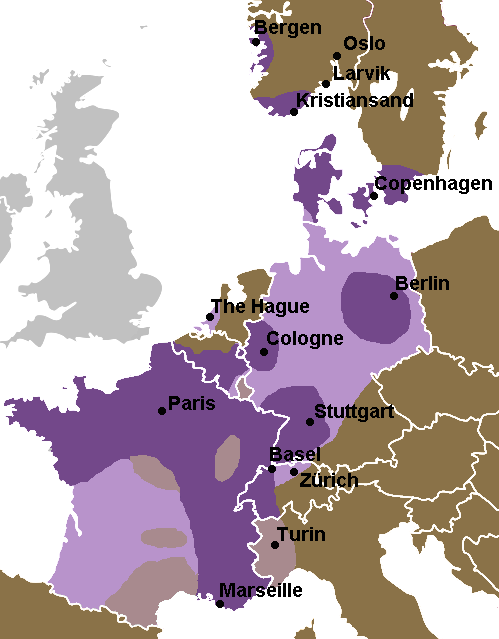
Distribution of guttural R (such as [ʁ ʀ χ]) in Europe in the mid-20th century. not usual only in some educated speech usual in educated speech general

There are two main hypotheses regarding the origin of the uvular trill in European languages. According to one hypothesis, the uvular trill originated in Standard French around the 17th century and spread to the standard varieties of German, Danish, Portuguese, and some of those of Dutch, Norwegian and Swedish. It is also present in other areas of Europe, but it is not clear if such pronunciations are due to French influence. In most cases, varieties have shifted the sound to a voiced uvular fricative [ʁ] or approximant [ʁ̞].

The other main hypothesis is that the uvular trill originated within Germanic languages through the weakening and vocalization of the alveolar trill [r] toward an open back vowel [ɑ] (notable for its pharyngealization), with the uvular trill subsequently emerging as a strengthened articulation of this vocalization. Accordingly, there is ample evidence that the uvular trill existed in German dialects long before the 17th century, suggesting that while the French usage may have influenced its spread, it was not the ultimate origin.

| Language | | Word | IPA | Meaning | Notes |
|---|---|---|---|---|---|
| Afrikaans | Parts of the former Cape Province | rooi | [ʀoːi̯] | 'red' | May be a fricative [ʁ] instead. See Afrikaans phonology |
| Arabic | North Mesopotamian | قمر | [ˈqʌmʌʀ] | 'moon' | Corresponds to [r, ɾ] in most other varieties. See Arabic phonology |
| Breton | Kerneveg | bro | [bʀoː] | 'country' | Corresponds to [r~ʁ] in standard Breton. See Breton phonology |
| Catalan | Northern | córrer | [ˈkuʀə] | 'to run' | It varies with /ʁ/. See Catalan phonology |
| Dutch | Belgian Limburg | rood | [ʀoːt] | 'red' | More commonly a flap. Uvular pronunciations appear to be gaining ground in the Randstad. Realization of /r/ varies considerably among dialects. See Dutch phonology |
| Dutch | Central Netherlands | rood | [ʀoːt] | 'red' | More commonly a flap. Uvular pronunciations appear to be gaining ground in the Randstad. Realization of /r/ varies considerably among dialects. See Dutch phonology |
| Dutch | Randstad | rood | [ʀoːt] | 'red' | More commonly a flap. Uvular pronunciations appear to be gaining ground in the Randstad. Realization of /r/ varies considerably among dialects. See Dutch phonology |
| Dutch | Southern Netherlands | rood | [ʀoːt] | 'red' | More commonly a flap. Uvular pronunciations appear to be gaining ground in the Randstad. Realization of /r/ varies considerably among dialects. See Dutch phonology |
| Dutch | Flemish Brabant | rood | [ʀoːt] | 'red' | More commonly a flap. It is one of the least common realizations of /r/ in these areas. See Dutch phonology |
| Dutch | Northern Netherlands | rood | [ʀoːt] | 'red' | More commonly a flap. It is one of the least common realizations of /r/ in these areas. See Dutch phonology |
| Dutch | West Flanders | rood | [ʀoːt] | 'red' | More commonly a flap. It is one of the least common realizations of /r/ in these areas. See Dutch phonology |
| Estonian | Some speakers, mostly in Tartu County | kurk | [kuʀk] | 'cucumber' | |
| English | Cape Flats | red | [ʀɛd] | 'red' | Possible realization of /r/; may be [ɹ ~ ɹ̝ ~ ɾ ~ r] instead. See South African English phonology |
| English | Northumbrian dialect | red | [ʀɛd] | 'red' | More often a fricative. Dialectal "Northumbrian Burr", mostly found in eastern Northumberland, declining. See English phonology |
| English | Sierra Leonean | red | [ʀɛd] | 'red' | More often a fricative. |
| French | | rendez-vous | [ʀɑ̃devu] | 'rendezvous', 'appointment' | Dialectal. More commonly an approximant or a fricative [ʁ]. See French phonology |
| German | Standard | rot | [ʀoːt] | 'red' | In free variation with a voiced uvular fricative and approximant. Can be realized as voiceless after voiceless consonants. See Standard German phonology |
| Hebrew | | יָרֹק / yarok | [jaˈʀok] | 'green' | May also be a fricative or approximant. See Modern Hebrew phonology |
| Italian | Some speakers | raro | [ˈʀäːʀo] | 'rare' | Rendition alternative to the standard Italian alveolar trill [r], due to individual orthoepic defects and/or regional variations that make the alternative sound more prevalent, notably in South Tyrol (bordering with German-speaking Austria), Aosta Valley (bordering with France) and in parts of the Parma province, more markedly around Fidenza. Other alternative sounds may be a voiced uvular fricative [ʁ] or a labiodental approximant [ʋ]. See Italian phonology. |
| Japreria | | peŕo | [peʀo] | 'dog' | Contrasts with flap [ɾ], represented orthographically by ŕ. |
| Judaeo-Spanish | | mujer | [muˈʒɛʀ] | 'woman', 'wife' | |
| Low Saxon | Zwols | priezen/prysen | [pʀi:zn̩] | 'prices' | Only in the city and its immediate surroundings, not in the area surrounding Zwolle. |
| Luxembourgish | | Rou | [ʀəʊ̯] | 'silence' | Prevocalic allophone of /ʀ/. See Luxembourgish phonology |
| Occitan | Eastern | garric | [ɡaʀi] | 'oak' | Contrasts with alveolar trill ([ɡari] 'cured') |
| Occitan | Provençal | parts | [paʀ] | 'parts' | See Occitan phonology |
| Occitan | Southern Auvergnat | garçon | [ɡaʀˈsu] | 'son' | See Occitan phonology |
| Occitan | Southeastern Limousin | filh | [fʲiʀ] | 'son' | See Occitan phonology |
| Norwegian | Southern dialects | rar | [ʁ̞ɑːʁ̞] | 'strange' | Either an approximant or a fricative. See Norwegian phonology |
| Norwegian | Southwestern dialects | rar | [ʁ̞ɑːʁ̞] | 'strange' | Either an approximant or a fricative. See Norwegian phonology |
| Portuguese | European | rarear | [ʀɐɾiˈaɾ] | 'to get scarcer' | Alternates with other uvular forms and the older alveolar trill. See Portuguese phonology |
| Portuguese | Fluminense | mercado | [me̞ʀˈkadu] | 'market', 'fair' | Tendency to be replaced by fricative pronunciations. In coda position, it is generally in free variation with [x], [χ], [ʁ], [ħ] and [h] before non-voicing environments. |
| Portuguese | Sulista | repolho | [ʀe̞ˈpoʎ̟ʊ] | 'cabbage' | Alternates with the alveolar trill and [h] depending on the region. Never used in coda. |
| Romani | Some dialects | rrom | [ʀom] | 'man' | Allophone of a descendant of the Indic retroflex set, so often transcribed /ɽ/. A coronal flap, approximant or trill in other dialects; in some it merges with /r/ |
| Selkup | Northern dialects | ӄаӄри | [ˈqaʀlɪ̈] | 'sledge' | Allophone of /q/ before liquids |
| Sioux | Lakota | ǧí | [ʀí] | 'it's brown' | Allophone of /ʁ/ before /i/ |
| Sotho | Regional variant | moriri | [moʀiʀi] | 'hair' | Imported from French missionaries. See Sesotho phonology |
| Swedish | Southern | räv | [ʀɛːv] | 'fox' | See Swedish phonology |
| Yiddish | Standard | בריק | [bʀɪk] | 'bridge' | More commonly a flap [ʀ̆]; can be alveolar [ɾ ~ r] instead. See Yiddish phonology |

== Fricative trill ==
Voiced uvular fricative trill

ʀ̝

Audio sample
- source · help

Some languages have a voiced uvular fricative trill, which can be represented in the IPA as ⟨ʀ̝⟩. Teuthonista uses ⟨ꭆ⟩ and ⟨ʀ̑⟩, the first having stronger frication.

| Language | | Word | IPA | Meaning | Notes |
|---|---|---|---|---|---|
| Danish | Standard | rød | [ʀ̝œ̠ð̠] | 'red' | Most often an approximant when initial. In other positions, it can be either a fricative (also described as voiceless [χ]) or an approximant. Also described as pharyngeal [ʕ̞]. It can be a fricative trill in word-initial positions when emphasizing a word. See Danish phonology |
| Limburgish | Maastrichtian | drei | [dʀ̝ɛi̯] | 'three' | Fricative trill; the fricative component varies between uvular and post-velar. See Maastrichtian dialect phonology and Weert dialect phonology |
| Limburgish | Weert dialect | drej | [dʀ̝æj] | 'three' | Fricative trill; the fricative component varies between uvular and post-velar. See Maastrichtian dialect phonology and Weert dialect phonology |
| West Flemish | Bruges dialect | onder | [ˈuŋəʀ̝] | 'under' | A fricative trill with little friction. An alveolar [r] is used in the neighbouring rural area. |

== See also ==
- Index of phonetics articles

== Notes ==
| Place → | Labial | | | | | Coronal | | | | | | | | | | Dorsal | | | | | Laryngeal | | | |
| Manner ↓ | Bilabial | | Labiodental | | Linguolabial | | Dental | | Alveolar | | Postalveolar | | Retroflex | | (Alveolo-)palatal | | Velar | | Uvular | | Pharyngeal/epiglottal | | Glottal | |
|---|---|---|---|---|---|---|---|---|---|---|---|---|---|---|---|---|---|---|---|---|---|---|---|---|
| Nasal | m̥ | m | ɱ̊ | ɱ | | n̼ | n̪̊ | n̪ | n̥ | n | n̠̊ | n̠ | ɳ̊ | ɳ | ɲ̊ | ɲ | ŋ̊ | ŋ | ɴ̥ | ɴ | | | | |
| Plosive | p | b | p̪ | b̪ | t̼ | d̼ | t̪ | d̪ | t | d | | | ʈ | ɖ | c | ɟ | k | ɡ | q | ɢ | ʡ | | ʔ | |
| Sibilant affricate | | | | | | | t̪s̪ | d̪z̪ | ts | dz | t̠ʃ | d̠ʒ | tʂ | dʐ | tɕ | dʑ | | | | | | | | |
| Non-sibilant affricate | pɸ | bβ | p̪f | b̪v | | | t̪θ | d̪ð | tɹ̝̊ | dɹ̝ | t̠ɹ̠̊˔ | d̠ɹ̠˔ | | | cç | ɟʝ | kx | ɡɣ | qχ | ɢʁ | ʡʜ | ʡʢ | ʔh | |
| Sibilant fricative | | | | | | | s̪ | z̪ | s | z | ʃ | ʒ | ʂ | ʐ | ɕ | ʑ | | | | | | | | |
| Non-sibilant fricative | ɸ | β | f | v | θ̼ | ð̼ | θ | ð | θ̠ | ð̠ | ɹ̠̊˔ | ɹ̠˔ | ɻ̊˔ | ɻ˔ | ç | ʝ | x | ɣ | χ | ʁ | ħ | ʕ | h | ɦ |
| Approximant | | β̞ | | ʋ | | | | ð̞ | | ɹ | | ɹ̠ | | ɻ | | j | | ɰ | | | | | | ˷ |
| Tap/flap | | ⱱ̟ | | ⱱ | | | | | ɾ̥ | ɾ | | | ɽ̊ | ɽ | | | | | | ɢ̆ | | ʡ̆ | | |
| Trill | ʙ̥ | ʙ | | | | | | | r̥ | r | | r̠ | ɽ̊r̥ | ɽr | | | | | ʀ̥ | ʀ | ʜ | ʢ | | |
| Lateral affricate | | | | | | | | | tɬ | dɮ | | | tꞎ | d𝼅 | c𝼆 | ɟʎ̝ | k𝼄 | ɡʟ̝ | | | | | | |
| Lateral fricative | | | | | | | ɬ̪ | | ɬ | ɮ | | | ꞎ | 𝼅 | 𝼆 | ʎ̝ | 𝼄 | ʟ̝ | | | | | | |
| Lateral approximant | | | | | | | | l̪ | l̥ | l | | l̠ | ɭ̊ | ɭ | ʎ̥ | ʎ | ʟ̥ | ʟ | | ʟ̠ | | | | |
| Lateral tap/flap | | | | | | | | | ɺ̥ | ɺ | | | 𝼈̊ | 𝼈 | | ʎ̆ | | ʟ̆ | | | | | | |

| | | BL | LD | D | A | PA | RF | P | V | U |
|---|---|---|---|---|---|---|---|---|---|---|
| Implosive | Voiced | ɓ | | | ɗ | | ᶑ | ʄ | ɠ | ʛ |
| Implosive | Voiceless | ɓ̥ | | | ɗ̥ | | ᶑ̊ | ʄ̊ | ɠ̊ | ʛ̥ |
| Ejective | Stop | pʼ | | | tʼ | | ʈʼ | cʼ | kʼ | qʼ |
| Ejective | Affricate | | p̪fʼ | tθʼ | tsʼ | tʃʼ | tʂʼ | tɕʼ | kxʼ | qχʼ |
| Ejective | Fricative | ɸʼ | fʼ | θʼ | sʼ | ʃʼ | ʂʼ | ɕʼ | xʼ | χʼ |
| Ejective | Lateral affricate | | | | tɬʼ | | | c𝼆ʼ | k𝼄ʼ | q𝼄ʼ |
| Ejective | Lateral fricative | | | | ɬʼ | | | | | |
| Click (top: velar; bottom: uvular) | Tenuis | kʘ qʘ | | kǀ qǀ | kǃ qǃ | | k𝼊 q𝼊 | kǂ qǂ | | |
| Click (top: velar; bottom: uvular) | Voiced | ɡʘ ɢʘ | | ɡǀ ɢǀ | ɡǃ ɢǃ | | ɡ𝼊 ɢ𝼊 | ɡǂ ɢǂ | | |
| Click (top: velar; bottom: uvular) | Nasal | ŋʘ ɴʘ | | ŋǀ ɴǀ | ŋǃ ɴǃ | | ŋ𝼊 ɴ𝼊 | ŋǂ ɴǂ | ʞ | |
| Click (top: velar; bottom: uvular) | Tenuis lateral | | | | kǁ qǁ | | | | | |
| Click (top: velar; bottom: uvular) | Voiced lateral | | | | ɡǁ ɢǁ | | | | | |
| Click (top: velar; bottom: uvular) | Nasal lateral | | | | ŋǁ ɴǁ | | | | | |
