= Alphonse Olterdissen =

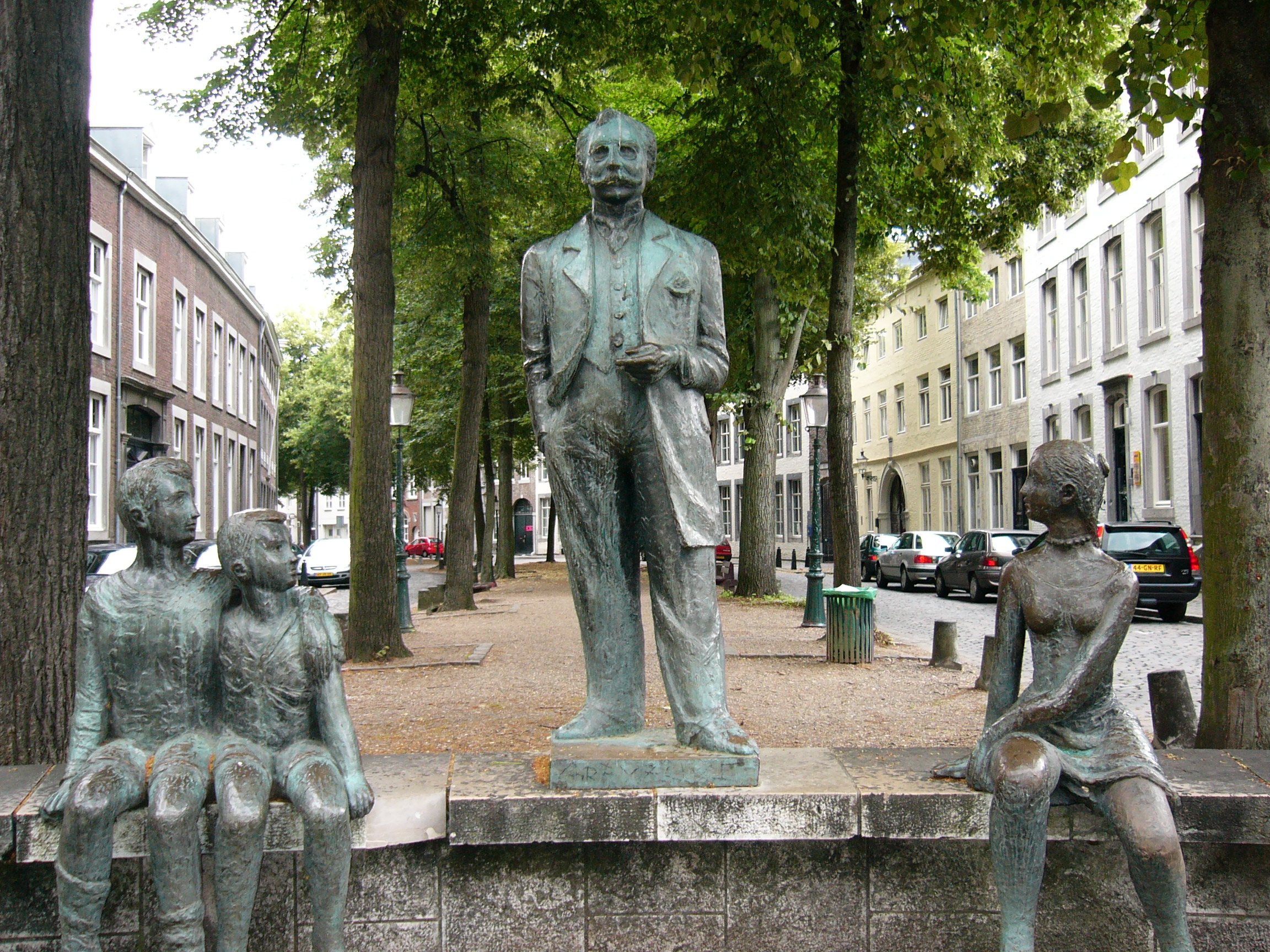
- Statue of Olterdissen in the Jekerkwartier neighbourhood, Maastricht
- Born: Alphonse Olterdissen
- Education: Rijksschool voor de Kunstnijverheid
- Writing career
- Language: Dutch, Maastrichtian

Alphonse (Alfons) Olterdissen (Maastricht, December 12, 1865 - Maastricht, February 24, 1923) was a Dutch writer, poet and composer who wrote extensively in the Maastrichtian dialect. The final stanza of his opera Trijn de Begijn eventually became the local anthem of Maastricht. The theme, composed by his brother Guus, bears considerable similarities to the Romanian composer Ciprian Porumbescu's (1853–1883) "Pe-al nostru steag e scris Unire", though it is unknown if either brother knew this piece.

== Biography ==
Olterdissen was born to a German father and a mother from the province of Zeeland and grew up speaking Dutch, only learning the Maastricht dialect socially. In 1883 he moved to Amsterdam to attend the Rijksschool voor de Kunstnijverheid in order to develop his abilities in painting. After graduating from the Rijksschool he set up a school in Maastricht, without success. Hereafter, Olterdissen focused on promoting tourism to Maastricht.

Olterdissen's lack of business skill led him to gather a significant debt which he tried to alleviate by writing plays and operettas. Initially not achieving much success, his fortunes increased in 1907 with De kaptein vaan Köpenick. This was a play about the then popular Wilhelm Voigt (also known as Hauptmann von Köpenick). A second success story was the comical opera Trijn de Begijn in 1910.

== Local anthem ==
This is the text of the final stanza of Trijn de Begijn, which was adopted in 2002 as the official anthem of the city of Maastricht by its municipal government .

Maastrichtian municipal anthem (Mestreechs Volksleed) (2002)

1
Hoera! Vivat! Mestreech!!!
Jao diech höbs us aon 't hart gelege,
Mestreech, door alle ieuwe heer.
Veer bleve diech altied genege
En deilde dreufheid en plezeer.
Veer huurde nao dien aw histories
Te peerd op grampeer ziene sjoet.
Ues ouge blónke bij dien glories ·
Of perelde bij diene noet.

2
En dee vaan diech 't sjoens wèlt prijze,
In taol, die al wie zinge klink,
Dat dee op nui Mestreechter wijze
Zien aajd Mestreech mèt us bezingk.
Me zong vaan diech ten alle tije,
Eus mojers zonge bij de weeg,
En voolte veer us rech tevreie
Daan zong ze e leedsje vaan Mestreech.

3
Doe, blom vaan Nederlands landouwe,
Gegreujd op 't graaf vaan Sintervaos,
Bis weerdig dobbel te besjouwe,
Gespiegeld in de blanke Maos.
'n Staar, De witste oet de klaore,
Besjijnt diech mèt häör straole zach
En, um diech zuver te bewaore,
'nen Ingel hèlt bij diech de wach.

4
Wie dèks woorste neet priesgegeve,
Mèh heels dien kroen toch opgeriech
En ongeknak bis te gebleve,
Door euze band vaan trouw aon diech.
Daorum de hand us tòwgestoke,
't Oug geriech op 't stareleech;
En weur dat oug daan ins gebroke,
Daan beidt veur us het aajd Mestreech.
