= Pe-al nostru steag e scris Unire =

Romanian patriotic song

E scris pe tricolor Unire (Note: The name of the song was changed from "Pe-al nostru steag e scris Unire".)
English: Union is written on our flag
- Former national anthem of Socialist Republic of Romania
- Lyrics: Andrei Bârseanu, 1880
- Music: Ciprian Porumbescu, 1880
- Adopted: 1975
- Relinquished: 1977

Audio sample
- E scris pe tricolor Unire: file; help

"Pe-al nostru steag e scris Unire" (transl. "Union is written on our flag") is a Romanian patriotic song dedicated to the United Principalities of Moldavia and Wallachia established in 1859. The text was written by Andrei Bârseanu and the music was composed by Ciprian Porumbescu in 1880. Its tune is now used in the Albanian national anthem. The anthem of the Dutch city of Maastricht bears considerable similarity to it, though it is unknown if Guus Olterdissen or his brother, Alfons, knew the tune.

The anthem was used on various solemn occasions in the Moldavian Democratic Republic during its brief existence between 1917 and 1918, alongside Deșteaptă-te, române!. The song was an official anthem for the Party of the Nation, established in June 1940 by King Carol II as the basis for his authoritarian regime. In 1975, after a national contest for a new anthem, Nicolae Ceaușescu made this song the national anthem of the Socialist Republic of Romania with lyrics modified by the Romanian Communist Party (PCR) to reference communism and title changed to "E scris pe tricolor Unire". However, since Albania already used the song since 1912, "Trei culori" ("Three colors") was adopted in 1977.

On 28 January 2016, Romanian journalist George Roca published an article stating that the anthem of the Dutch city of Maastricht had been copied from "Pe-al nostru steag e scris Unire". Mestreechs Volksleed, adopted in 2002, had a great similarity to the Romanian song, so Roca compared both songs and the Albanian anthem. He said that, unlike the Albanians which were proud of the Romanian origin of their anthem, the Dutch "stole" the hymn even though they blocked Romania from entering the Schengen Area for corruption claims. The controversy had a great impact on Romanian media, where news began to spread in several newspapers, as well as in Wikipedia. Months later, Roca declared satisfaction after seeing the effect that his article had had. Some residents of Maastricht have said this is just a coincidence and an article in the newspaper De Limburger explained that Mestreechs Volksleed originated from the closing song to the 1912 Dutch opera Trijn de Begijn, made by Alphonse Olterdissen (lyrics) and Guus Olterdissen (melody). It was also said that Olterdissen was unlikely to have been inspired by Romanian songs, as he used to use more nearby German and French ones. The similarities between the two songs have sparked fights on the Internet in which Romanians accuse Dutch people of having "stolen" the song even when Albanians "had the decency" of asking for it, while Dutch people reject these claims.

== Lyrics ==
=== Original lyrics (1880) ===
Pe-al nostru steag e scris unire,
Unire-n cuget și simțiri
Și sub măreața lui umbrire
Vom înfrunta orice loviri

Acel ce-n luptă grea se teme
El însuși e rătăcitor,
Iar noi uniți în orice vreme
Am fost, vom fi învingători.

Am înarmat a noastră mână
Ca să păzim un scump pământ,
Dreptatea e a lui stăpână,
Iar domn e adevărul sfânt.

Și-n cartea veșniciei scrie
Că țări și neamuri vor pieri,
Dar mândra noastră Românie
Etern, etern va înflori.

Translation:

On our flag is written union,
Union of thoughts and feelings
And under its great shadow
We'll face any blows.

The one that in a fierce battle is afraid
He himself is lost,
But we, united any time
We were, and will be victorious

We armed our hand
To guard a precious land
Justice is its master
And its lord is the holy truth

And in the book of eternity is written
That countries and peoples will perish
But our proud Romania
Forever, forever will flourish.

=== Lyrics modified by the PCR ===
Nicolae Ceaușescu made the lyrics of this song the national anthem of Romania, but since Albania already used it, it was replaced in 1977.

The modified lyrics were the following:

E scris pe tricolor unire
Pe roșul steag liberator
Prin luptă sub a lor umbrire
Spre comunism urcăm în zbor
𝄆 Acel ce-n luptă grea se teme
Nu stă între învingători
Iar noi, uniți în orice vreme
Am fost, vom fi biruitori 𝄇

Viteji, străbunii apărară
Pe dragul românesc meleag
Noi nu aflăm dușmani în țară
Primind prietenii cu drag
𝄆 În cartea Comunistă scrie
Că asuprirea va pieri
Prin noi, iubita Românie
Mereu, în veci va înflori 𝄇

Stăpîn pe-al său destin, poporul
De viață dreaptă făurar
Clădește falnic viitorul
Urmînd partidul unitar
𝄆 Tu, Românie socialistă
În lume, mîndră vei sui
În era nouă comunistă
Etern, etern vei dăinui 𝄇

Translation:

On the tricolour is written union
On the red liberating flag
Through battles beneath their shade
To communism we climb in flight
𝄆 He who grows afraid in battle
Is not among the conquerors
But we, united in all time
Have been and shall be victorious 𝄇

Bravely, our ancestors defended
The dear Romanian land
In our country, we have no enemies
We accept our friends with love
𝄆 In the communist book it is written
Exploitation shall reach its end
Through us, beloved Romania
Will flourish in eternity 𝄇

Masters of their destiny, the people
Are forging a correct life
Building a glorious future
Following the uniting party
𝄆 You, socialist Romania
In the world, shall proudly climb
In the new communist era
Eternally you shall thrive 𝄇
