= Mid front unrounded vowel =

Vowel sound represented by ⟨e̞⟩ or ⟨ɛ̝⟩ in IPA

e̞

ɛ̝
- IPA number: 302 430

Audio sample
- source · help

Encoding
- Entity (decimal): &#101;&#798;
- Unicode (hex): U+0065 U+031E
- X-SAMPA: e_o
- Braille: ⠑ (braille pattern dots-15) ⠠ (braille pattern dots-6) ⠣ (braille pattern dots-126)

IPA: Vowels

	Front	Central	Back
Close	i y	ɨ ʉ	ɯ u
Near-close	ɪ ʏ		ʊ
Close-mid	e ø	ɘ ɵ	ɤ o
Mid	e̞ ø̞	ə	ɤ̞ o̞
Open-mid	ɛ œ	ɜ ɞ	ʌ ɔ
Near-open	æ	ɐ
Open	a ɶ	ä	ɑ ɒ

- IPA help
- audio
- full chart
- template

Legend: unrounded • rounded

The mid front unrounded vowel is a type of vowel sound that is used in some spoken languages. There is no dedicated symbol in the International Phonetic Alphabet that represents the exact mid front unrounded vowel between close-mid [e] and open-mid [ɛ], but it is normally written ⟨e⟩. If precision is required, diacritics may be used, such as ⟨e̞⟩ or ⟨ɛ̝⟩ (the former, indicating lowering, being more common). In Sinology and Koreanology, ⟨ᴇ⟩ is sometimes used, for example in the Zhengzhang Shangfang reconstructions or in Chao Yuen Ren Grammar of Spoken Chinese.

For many of the languages that have only one phonemic front unrounded vowel in the mid-vowel area (neither close nor open), the vowel is pronounced as a true mid vowel and is phonetically distinct from either a close-mid or open-mid vowel. Examples are Basque, Spanish, Romanian, Japanese, Turkish, Finnish, Greek, Hejazi Arabic, Serbo-Croatian and Korean (Seoul dialect). A number of dialects of English also have such a mid front vowel. However, there is no general predisposition. Igbo and Egyptian Arabic, for example, have a close-mid [e], and Bulgarian has an open-mid [ɛ], but none of these languages have another phonemic mid front vowel.

Kensiu, spoken in Malaysia and Thailand, is claimed to be unique in having true-mid vowels that are phonemically distinct from both close-mid and open-mid vowels, without differences in other parameters such as backness or roundedness.

Some of the vowels listed in the table below may phonetically be more back than typical front vowels, as near-front vowels. If precision is required, this may instead be called a mid near-front unrounded vowel.

== Features ==
- Its vowel height is mid, which means the tongue is positioned halfway between a close vowel and an open vowel.
- Its vowel backness is front, which means the tongue is positioned forward in the mouth without creating a constriction that would be classified as a consonant.
- It is unrounded, which means that the lips are not rounded.

== Occurrence ==
Language		Word	IPA	Meaning	Notes
Afrikaans	Standard	bed	[bɛ̝t]	'bed'	Typically transcribed in IPA with ⟨ɛ⟩. The height varies between mid [ɛ̝] and close-mid [e]. See Afrikaans phonology
Arabic	Hejazi	بـيـت / bēt	[be̞ːt]	'home'	See Hejazi Arabic phonology
Breton					Possible realization of unstressed /ɛ/; can be open-mid [ɛ] or close-mid [e] instead.
Catalan	Modern Algherese	sec	[ˈs̺ɛ̝k]	'dry'	Open-mid and close-mid vowels merge into mid vowels. See Catalan phonology
Catalan	Northern	sec	[ˈs̺ɛ̝k]	'dry'	Open-mid and close-mid vowels merge into mid vowels. See Catalan phonology
Catalan	Some speakers	sec	[ˈs̺ɛ̝k]	'dry'	Open-mid and close-mid vowels merge into mid vowels. Found in some places bordering the Aragonese and Spanish-speaking areas. A five to six vowel system (i.e. without /ɛ/ and/or /ɔ/), can be found in some areas.
Chinese	Mandarin	也 / yě	[je̞˨˩˦]	'also'	See Standard Chinese phonology
Czech	Bohemian	led	[lɛ̝̈t]	'ice'	Near-front; may be open-mid [ɛ] instead. See Czech phonology
Dutch	Some speakers	zet	[zɛ̝t]	'shove' (n.)	Open-mid [ɛ] in Standard Dutch. See Dutch phonology
English	Broad New Zealand	cat	[kʰɛ̝t]	'cat'	Lower in other New Zealand varieties; corresponds to [æ] in other accents. See New Zealand English phonology
English	Cockney	bird	[bɛ̝̈ːd]	'bird'	Near-front; occasional realization of /ɜː/. It can be rounded [œ̝ː] or, more often, unrounded central [ɜ̝ː] instead. Typically transcribed in IPA with ⟨ɜː⟩.
English	Cultivated New Zealand	let	[le̞t]	'let'	Higher in other New Zealand varieties. See New Zealand English phonology
English	Received Pronunciation	let	[le̞t]	'let'	Many speakers pronounce a more open vowel [ɛ] instead. See English phonology
English	Inland Northern American	bit	[bë̞t̚]	'bit'	Near-front, may be [ɪ] (also [ə] in Scotland) instead for other speakers. See Northern Cities vowel shift
English	Scottish	bit	[bë̞ʔ]	'bit'	Near-front, may be [ɪ] (also [ə] in Scotland) instead for other speakers. See Northern Cities vowel shift
English	Yorkshire	play	[ple̞ː]	'play'	
Estonian		sule	[ˈsule̞ˑ]	'feather' (gen. sg.)	Common word-final allophone of /e/. See Estonian phonology
Finnish		menen	[ˈme̞ne̞n]	'I go'	See Finnish phonology
German	Standard	Bett	[b̥ɛ̝t]	'bed'	More often described as open-mid front [ɛ]. See Standard German phonology
German	Austrian and Swiss	danke	[ˈd̥aŋkɛ̝]	'thanks'	The most common realization of syllable-final /ə/.
German	Bernese dialect	rède	[ˈrɛ̝d̥ə]	'to speak'	Typically transcribed in IPA with ⟨ɛ⟩. See Bernese German phonology
Greek	Modern Standard	πες / pes	[pe̞s̠]	'say!'	See Modern Greek phonology
Hebrew		כן/ken	[ke̞n]	'yes'	Hebrew vowels are not shown in the script, see Niqqud and Modern Hebrew phonology
Hungarian		hét	[he̞ːt̪]	'seven'	Also described as close-mid [eː]. See Hungarian phonology
Ibibio		[sé̞]		'look'	
Icelandic		kenna	[ˈcʰɛ̝nːä]	'to teach'	Typically transcribed in IPA with ⟨ɛ⟩. The long allophone is often diphthongized to [eɛ]. See Icelandic phonology
Italian	Standard	decidere	[d̪eˈt͡ʃiːd̪eɾe̞]	'to choose'	Common realization of the unstressed /e/. See Italian phonology
Italian	Northern accents	penso	[ˈpe̞ŋso]	'I think'	Common realization of /e/. See Italian phonology
Japanese		笑み/emi	[e̞mʲi]	'smile'	See Japanese phonology
Jebero		[ˈiʃë̞k]		'bat'	Near-front; possible realization of /ɘ/.
Korean		내가 / naega	[nɛ̝ɡɐː]	'I'	Pronunciation of ⟨ɛ⟩. See Korean phonology
Latvian		ēst	[ê̞ːs̪t̪]	'to eat'	Typically transcribed in IPA with ⟨e⟩.
Limburgish	Maastrichtian	bèd	[bɛ̝t]	'bed'	Typically transcribed in IPA with ⟨ɛ⟩. See Maastrichtian dialect phonology and Weert dialect phonology
Limburgish	Weert dialect	zègke	[ˈzɛ̝ɡə]	'to say'	Typically transcribed in IPA with ⟨ɛ⟩. See Maastrichtian dialect phonology and Weert dialect phonology
Low Saxon	Gelders-Overijssels and Drents	èèt zie?	[e̞ːt]	'do they eat?'	Only around the border of eten - èten, [e:] vs [ɛ:]
Macedonian	Standard	мед	[ˈmɛd̪]	'honey'	
Malay	Standard	elok	[e̞ˈlo̞ʔ]	'good'	See Malay phonology
Norwegian	Urban East	nett	[nɛ̝tː]	'net'	See Norwegian phonology
Romanian		fete	[ˈfe̞t̪e̞]	'girls'	See Romanian phonology
Russian		человек	[t͡ɕɪlɐˈvʲe̞k]	'human'	Occurs only after soft consonants. See Russian phonology
Serbo-Croatian		тек / tek	[t̪ĕ̞k]	'only'	See Serbo-Croatian phonology
Slovak	Standard	behať	[ˈbɛ̝ɦäc]	'to run'	See Slovak phonology
Slovene		velikan	[ʋe̞liˈká̠ːn]	'giant'	Unstressed vowel, as well as an allophone of /e/ before /j/ when a vowel does not follow within the same word. See Slovene phonology
Spanish		bebé	[be̞ˈβ̞e̞]	'baby'	See Spanish phonology
Swedish	Central Standard	häll	[hɛ̝l̪]	'flat rock'	Typically transcribed in IPA with ⟨ɛ⟩. Many dialects pronounce short /e/ and /ɛ/ the same. See Swedish phonology
Tera		ze	[zè̞ː]	'spoke'	
Turkish		ev	[e̞v]	'house'	See Turkish phonology
Upper Sorbian		njebjo	[ˈn̠ʲɛ̝bʲɔ]	'sky'	Allophone of /ɛ/ between soft consonants and after a soft consonant, excluding /j/ in both cases.
Yoruba					Typically transcribed in IPA with ⟨ɛ̃⟩. It is nasalized, and may be open-mid [ɛ̃] instead.

== Notes ==
Place →	Labial					Coronal										Dorsal					Laryngeal			
Manner ↓	Bilabial		Labiodental		Linguolabial		Dental		Alveolar		Postalveolar		Retroflex		(Alveolo-)palatal		Velar		Uvular		Pharyngeal/epiglottal		Glottal	
Nasal	m̥	m	ɱ̊	ɱ		n̼	n̪̊	n̪	n̥	n	n̠̊	n̠	ɳ̊	ɳ	ɲ̊	ɲ	ŋ̊	ŋ	ɴ̥	ɴ				
Plosive	p	b	p̪	b̪	t̼	d̼	t̪	d̪	t	d			ʈ	ɖ	c	ɟ	k	ɡ	q	ɢ	ʡ		ʔ	
Sibilant affricate							t̪s̪	d̪z̪	ts	dz	t̠ʃ	d̠ʒ	tʂ	dʐ	tɕ	dʑ								
Non-sibilant affricate	pɸ	bβ	p̪f	b̪v			t̪θ	d̪ð	tɹ̝̊	dɹ̝	t̠ɹ̠̊˔	d̠ɹ̠˔			cç	ɟʝ	kx	ɡɣ	qχ	ɢʁ	ʡʜ	ʡʢ	ʔh	
Sibilant fricative							s̪	z̪	s	z	ʃ	ʒ	ʂ	ʐ	ɕ	ʑ								
Non-sibilant fricative	ɸ	β	f	v	θ̼	ð̼	θ	ð	θ̠	ð̠	ɹ̠̊˔	ɹ̠˔	ɻ̊˔	ɻ˔	ç	ʝ	x	ɣ	χ	ʁ	ħ	ʕ	h	ɦ
Approximant		β̞		ʋ				ð̞		ɹ		ɹ̠		ɻ		j		ɰ						˷
Tap/flap		ⱱ̟		ⱱ					ɾ̥	ɾ			ɽ̊	ɽ						ɢ̆		ʡ̆		
Trill	ʙ̥	ʙ							r̥	r		r̠	ɽ̊r̥	ɽr					ʀ̥	ʀ	ʜ	ʢ		
Lateral affricate									tɬ	dɮ			tꞎ	d𝼅	c𝼆	ɟʎ̝	k𝼄	ɡʟ̝						
Lateral fricative							ɬ̪		ɬ	ɮ			ꞎ	𝼅	𝼆	ʎ̝	𝼄	ʟ̝						
Lateral approximant								l̪	l̥	l		l̠	ɭ̊	ɭ	ʎ̥	ʎ	ʟ̥	ʟ		ʟ̠				
Lateral tap/flap									ɺ̥	ɺ			𝼈̊	𝼈		ʎ̆		ʟ̆						

		BL	LD	D	A	PA	RF	P	V	U
Implosive	Voiced	ɓ			ɗ		ᶑ	ʄ	ɠ	ʛ
Implosive	Voiceless	ɓ̥			ɗ̥		ᶑ̊	ʄ̊	ɠ̊	ʛ̥
Ejective	Stop	pʼ			tʼ		ʈʼ	cʼ	kʼ	qʼ
Ejective	Affricate		p̪fʼ	tθʼ	tsʼ	tʃʼ	tʂʼ	tɕʼ	kxʼ	qχʼ
Ejective	Fricative	ɸʼ	fʼ	θʼ	sʼ	ʃʼ	ʂʼ	ɕʼ	xʼ	χʼ
Ejective	Lateral affricate				tɬʼ			c𝼆ʼ	k𝼄ʼ	q𝼄ʼ
Ejective	Lateral fricative				ɬʼ					
Click (top: velar; bottom: uvular)	Tenuis	kʘ qʘ		kǀ qǀ	kǃ qǃ		k𝼊 q𝼊	kǂ qǂ		
Click (top: velar; bottom: uvular)	Voiced	ɡʘ ɢʘ		ɡǀ ɢǀ	ɡǃ ɢǃ		ɡ𝼊 ɢ𝼊	ɡǂ ɢǂ		
Click (top: velar; bottom: uvular)	Nasal	ŋʘ ɴʘ		ŋǀ ɴǀ	ŋǃ ɴǃ		ŋ𝼊 ɴ𝼊	ŋǂ ɴǂ	ʞ	
Click (top: velar; bottom: uvular)	Tenuis lateral				kǁ qǁ					
Click (top: velar; bottom: uvular)	Voiced lateral				ɡǁ ɢǁ					
Click (top: velar; bottom: uvular)	Nasal lateral				ŋǁ ɴǁ					
