= Voiced glottal fricative =

Consonantal sound represented by ⟨ɦ⟩ in IPA

ɦ
- IPA number: 147

Audio sample
- source · help

Encoding
- Entity (decimal): &#614;
- Unicode (hex): U+0266
- X-SAMPA: h\
- Braille: ⠦ (braille pattern dots-236) ⠓ (braille pattern dots-125)
Image

Voiced glottal approximant

ɦ̞

A voiced glottal fricative, sometimes called a breathy-voiced glottal transition, is a type of sound used in some spoken languages. It is used by some English-speakers as the "h" sound in "ahead". The symbol in the International Phonetic Alphabet that represents this sound is ⟨ɦ⟩.

A [ɦ] sound may have real glottal constriction in a number of languages (such as Finnish), making it a true fricative. However, in most languages that have it, it only patterns like a fricative or approximant phonologically, and lacks the usual phonetic characteristics of a consonant. In such languages, [ɦ] has no inherent place or manner of articulation. Thus it has been described as a breathy-voiced counterpart of the following vowel from a phonetic point of view. However, its characteristics are also influenced by the preceding vowels and whatever other sounds surround it. Therefore, it can be described as a segment whose only consistent feature is its breathy voice phonation in such languages.

Northern Wu languages such as Shanghainese contrast voiced and voiceless glottal fricatives. The two glottal fricatives pattern like plosives.

== Features ==
Features of a voiced glottal fricative:

- Its phonation is breathy voiced, or murmured, which means the vocal cords are loosely vibrating, with more air escaping than in a modally voiced sound. It is sometimes referred to as a "voiced h", but this is something of a misnomer, as there is no voicing in the usual sense; "breathy voiced" or "murmured" are preferred terms.
- In some languages, it has the constricted manner of articulation of a fricative. However, in many if not most it is a transitional state of the glottis with no manner of articulation other than its phonation type. Because there is no other constriction to produce friction in the vocal tract, most phoneticians no longer consider [ɦ] to be a fricative. True fricatives may have a murmured phonation in addition to producing friction elsewhere. However, the term "fricative" is generally retained for the historical reasons.
- It may have a glottal place of articulation. However, it may have no fricative articulation, making the term glottal mean that it is articulated by the vocal folds, but this is the nature of its phonation rather than a separate articulation. All consonants except for the glottals, and all vowels, have an individual place of articulation in addition to the state of the glottis. As with all other consonants, surrounding vowels influence the pronunciation [ɦ], and accordingly [ɦ] has only the place of articulation of these surrounding vowels.
- It is an oral consonant, which means that air is not allowed to escape through the nose.
- Because the sound is not produced with airflow over the tongue, the median–lateral dichotomy does not apply.
- Its airstream mechanism is pulmonic, which means it is articulated by pushing air only with the intercostal muscles and abdominal muscles, as in most speech sounds.

== Occurrence ==
Language		Word	IPA	Meaning	Notes
Afrikaans	Standard	hoe	[ɦu]	'how'	
Azeri	Standard	möhkəm / مؤحکم	[mœːɦcæm]	'solid'	
Albanian	Northern Tosk	dhe menjëherë udhëtari	[ðɛ miɲɜˈɦɛɹoθˈtaɽ̞i]	'and immediately the traveller'	Occasional allophone of /h/ in connected speech.
Bengali		হাতি	[ɦɐ.ti]	ˈelephent	See Bengali phonology
Basque	Northeastern dialects	hemen	[ɦemen]	'here'	Can be voiceless [h] instead.
Croatian	Some speakers	hajde		'lets go'	
Czech		host	[ˈɦɔst]	'guest'	See Czech phonology
Danish		Mon det har regnet?	[- te̝ ɦɑ -]	'I wonder if it has rained.'	Common allophone of /h/ between vowels. See Danish phonology
Dutch		gehoopt	[χ᫈əˈɦoːpt]	'hoped'	Lenis glottal consonant undefined for voicing. See Dutch phonology
English	Australian	behind	[bəˈɦɑe̯nd]	'behind'	Allophone of /h/ between voiced sounds. See Australian English phonology and English phonology
English	Received Pronunciation	behind	[bɪˈɦaɪ̯nd]	'behind'	Allophone of /h/ between voiced sounds. See Australian English phonology and English phonology
English	Broad South African	hand	[ˈɦɛn̪t̪]	'hand'	Some speakers, only before a stressed vowel.
Estonian		raha	[ˈrɑɦɑ]	'money'	Allophone of /h/ between voiced sounds. See Estonian phonology and Finnish phonology
Finnish		raha	[ˈrɑɦɑ]	'money'	Allophone of /h/ between voiced sounds. See Estonian phonology and Finnish phonology
French	Quebec	manger	[mãɦe]	'to eat'	Allophone of /ʒ/ for a limited minority of speakers. Can also be realized as a voiceless [h].
Hebrew		מַהֵר	[mäɦe̞ʁ]	'fast'	Occurs as an allophone of /h/ between voiced sounds. See Modern Hebrew phonology
Hindustani		हूँ / ہوں	[ɦũː]	'am'	See Hindustani phonology
Hungarian	Some speakers	tehát	[tɛɦaːt]	'so'	Intervocalic allophone of /h/. Occurs as voiceless /h/ for other speakers. See Hungarian phonology
Japanese	Some speakers	少し話して / sukoshi hanashite	[sɯkoɕi ɦanaɕi̥te]	'speak a little bit'	
Indonesian	Some speakers	bahan	[baˈɦan]	'ingredient'	
Kalabari		hóín	[ɦóĩ́]	'introduction'	
Korean		여행 / yeohaeng	[jʌɦεŋ]	'travel'	Occurs as an allophone of /h/ between voiced sounds. See Korean phonology
Limburgish		hart	[ɦɑ̽ʀ̝t]	'heart'	The example word is from the Maastrichtian dialect. See Maastrichtian dialect phonology
Lithuanian		humoras	[ˈɦʊmɔrɐs̪]	'humour'	Often pronounced instead of [ɣ]. See Lithuanian phonology
Marathi		हार	[ɦaːɾ]	'garland'	
Odia		ହଳ/haḷa	[ɦɔɭɔ]	'plough'	
Nepali		हल	[ɦʌl]	'solution'	See Nepali phonology
Parkari Koli		ۿُونَواڙ	[ɦuːnaʋaːɽ]	'desolate, deserted'	
Polish	Podhale dialect	hydrant	[ˈɦɘ̟d̪rän̪t̪]	'fire hydrant'	Contrasts with /x/. Standard Polish possesses only /x/. See Polish phonology
Polish	Kresy dialect	hydrant	[ˈɦɘ̟d̪rän̪t̪]	'fire hydrant'	Contrasts with /x/. Standard Polish possesses only /x/. See Polish phonology
Portuguese	Many speakers	hashi	[ɦɐˈʃi]	'chopsticks'	Allophone of /ʁ/. [h, ɦ] are marginal sounds to many speakers, particularly out of Brazil. See Portuguese phonology and guttural R
Portuguese	Many Brazilian dialects	esse rapaz	[ˈesi ɦaˈpajs]	'this youth' (m.)	Allophone of /ʁ/. [h, ɦ] are marginal sounds to many speakers, particularly out of Brazil. See Portuguese phonology and guttural R
Portuguese	Mineiro dialect	dormir	[doɦˈmi(h)]	'to sleep'	Before other voiced consonants, otherwise realized as [h].
Portuguese	Some Brazilian dialects	mesmo	[ˈmeɦmu]	'same'	Corresponds to either /s/ or /ʃ/ (depending on dialect) in the syllable coda. Might also be deleted.
Portuguese	Cearense dialect	gente	[ˈɦẽt͡ʃi]	'people'	Debuccalized from [ʒ], [v] or [z].
Punjabi		ਹਵਾ / ہوا	[ɦə̀ʋä̌ː]	'air'	
Riffian Berber		hwa	[ɦwæ]	'to go down'	
Romanian	Transylvanian dialects	haină	[ˈɦajnə]	'coat'	Corresponds to [h] in standard Romanian. See Romanian phonology
Sanskrit		हस्त / hasta	[ˈɦɐs̪t̪ɐ]	'hand'	See Sanskrit phonology
Sardinian	Northern Logudorese Sardinian	alga / agha	[ˈaɦɦa]	'garbage'	Appears geminate after /l/, /r/, /s/ as an allophone of [ɣ] and before /a/, /o/, /u/, assimilating those etymological consonants, which remain in writing according to the standard.
Silesian		hangrys	[ˈɦaŋɡrɨs]	'gooseberry'	
Slovak		hora	[ˈɦɔ̝rä]	'mountain'	See Slovak phonology
Slovene	Littoral dialects	hora	[ˈɦɔra]	'mountain'	This is a general feature of all Slovene dialects west of the Škofja Loka–Planina line. Corresponds to [ɡ] in other dialects. See Slovene phonology
Slovene	Rovte dialects	hora	[ˈɦɔra]	'mountain'	This is a general feature of all Slovene dialects west of the Škofja Loka–Planina line. Corresponds to [ɡ] in other dialects. See Slovene phonology
Slovene	Rosen Valley dialect	hora		'mountain'	This is a general feature of all Slovene dialects west of the Škofja Loka–Planina line. Corresponds to [ɡ] in other dialects. See Slovene phonology
Sylheti		ꠢꠥꠐꠇꠤ / হুটকি	[ɦuʈki]	'dried fish'	
Telugu		హల్లు	[ɦəlːu]	'Consonant'	
Ukrainian		голос	[ˈɦʷɔ̝ːlˤɘs]	'voice'	
Wu	Shanghainese	閒話 / ghe-gho	[ɦɛ˩ ɦo˦]	'language'	See Northern Wu phonology
Wu	Suzhounese	四號 / sy_{5}-ghau_{6}	[sz̩˥˩ ɦæ˧˩]	'fourth day of a Western month'	See Northern Wu phonology
Xukuru		marinha	[marĩɦa]	'ox'	
Zulu		ihhashi	[iːˈɦaːʃi]	'horse'	

=== Nasal ===
Nasalized voiced glottal approximant

ɦ̃

A nasalized voiced glottal fricative or approximant is a type of consonantal sound used in some spoken languages. The symbol in the International Phonetic Alphabet that represents this sound is ⟨ɦ̃⟩. Swazi distinguishes /h, h̃, ɦ, ɦ̃/.

Language		Word	IPA	Meaning	Notes
Basque	Zuberoan	ihitz	[ĩˈɦ̃ĩt͡s̻]	'dew, frost'	Phonemic
Lizu		[ɦ̃ɹ̃ə̃˩˧]		'mushroom'	Nasalization of glottals always occurs in glottal-initial words.
Umbundu					Contrasts with /h/

== See also ==
- Creaky-voiced glottal approximant

== Notes ==
Place →	Labial					Coronal										Dorsal					Laryngeal			
Manner ↓	Bilabial		Labiodental		Linguolabial		Dental		Alveolar		Postalveolar		Retroflex		(Alveolo-)palatal		Velar		Uvular		Pharyngeal/epiglottal		Glottal	
Nasal	m̥	m	ɱ̊	ɱ		n̼	n̪̊	n̪	n̥	n	n̠̊	n̠	ɳ̊	ɳ	ɲ̊	ɲ	ŋ̊	ŋ	ɴ̥	ɴ				
Plosive	p	b	p̪	b̪	t̼	d̼	t̪	d̪	t	d			ʈ	ɖ	c	ɟ	k	ɡ	q	ɢ	ʡ		ʔ	
Sibilant affricate							t̪s̪	d̪z̪	ts	dz	t̠ʃ	d̠ʒ	tʂ	dʐ	tɕ	dʑ								
Non-sibilant affricate	pɸ	bβ	p̪f	b̪v			t̪θ	d̪ð	tɹ̝̊	dɹ̝	t̠ɹ̠̊˔	d̠ɹ̠˔			cç	ɟʝ	kx	ɡɣ	qχ	ɢʁ	ʡʜ	ʡʢ	ʔh	
Sibilant fricative							s̪	z̪	s	z	ʃ	ʒ	ʂ	ʐ	ɕ	ʑ								
Non-sibilant fricative	ɸ	β	f	v	θ̼	ð̼	θ	ð	θ̠	ð̠	ɹ̠̊˔	ɹ̠˔	ɻ̊˔	ɻ˔	ç	ʝ	x	ɣ	χ	ʁ	ħ	ʕ	h	ɦ
Approximant		β̞		ʋ				ð̞		ɹ		ɹ̠		ɻ		j		ɰ						˷
Tap/flap		ⱱ̟		ⱱ					ɾ̥	ɾ			ɽ̊	ɽ						ɢ̆		ʡ̆		
Trill	ʙ̥	ʙ							r̥	r		r̠	ɽ̊r̥	ɽr					ʀ̥	ʀ	ʜ	ʢ		
Lateral affricate									tɬ	dɮ			tꞎ	d𝼅	c𝼆	ɟʎ̝	k𝼄	ɡʟ̝						
Lateral fricative							ɬ̪		ɬ	ɮ			ꞎ	𝼅	𝼆	ʎ̝	𝼄	ʟ̝						
Lateral approximant								l̪	l̥	l		l̠	ɭ̊	ɭ	ʎ̥	ʎ	ʟ̥	ʟ		ʟ̠				
Lateral tap/flap									ɺ̥	ɺ			𝼈̊	𝼈		ʎ̆		ʟ̆						

		BL	LD	D	A	PA	RF	P	V	U
Implosive	Voiced	ɓ			ɗ		ᶑ	ʄ	ɠ	ʛ
Implosive	Voiceless	ɓ̥			ɗ̥		ᶑ̊	ʄ̊	ɠ̊	ʛ̥
Ejective	Stop	pʼ			tʼ		ʈʼ	cʼ	kʼ	qʼ
Ejective	Affricate		p̪fʼ	tθʼ	tsʼ	tʃʼ	tʂʼ	tɕʼ	kxʼ	qχʼ
Ejective	Fricative	ɸʼ	fʼ	θʼ	sʼ	ʃʼ	ʂʼ	ɕʼ	xʼ	χʼ
Ejective	Lateral affricate				tɬʼ			c𝼆ʼ	k𝼄ʼ	q𝼄ʼ
Ejective	Lateral fricative				ɬʼ					
Click (top: velar; bottom: uvular)	Tenuis	kʘ qʘ		kǀ qǀ	kǃ qǃ		k𝼊 q𝼊	kǂ qǂ		
Click (top: velar; bottom: uvular)	Voiced	ɡʘ ɢʘ		ɡǀ ɢǀ	ɡǃ ɢǃ		ɡ𝼊 ɢ𝼊	ɡǂ ɢǂ		
Click (top: velar; bottom: uvular)	Nasal	ŋʘ ɴʘ		ŋǀ ɴǀ	ŋǃ ɴǃ		ŋ𝼊 ɴ𝼊	ŋǂ ɴǂ	ʞ	
Click (top: velar; bottom: uvular)	Tenuis lateral				kǁ qǁ					
Click (top: velar; bottom: uvular)	Voiced lateral				ɡǁ ɢǁ					
Click (top: velar; bottom: uvular)	Nasal lateral				ŋǁ ɴǁ					
