= Getelands =

Brabantian dialect of Belgium

- West Getelands
- Getelands; Westgetelands
- Native to: Belgium
- Region: Flemish Brabant and Limburg
- Language family: Indo-European: Germanic; West Germanic; Weser-Rhine Germanic; Low Franconian; Dutch; Brabantian; Southern; Getelands
- Dialects: Orsmaal-Gussenhoven

Language codes
- ISO 639-3: –

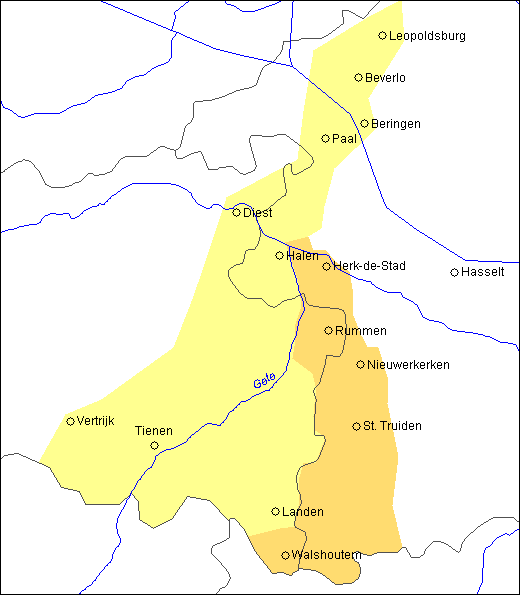
Yellow: The area where Getelands is spoken. Orange: The area where Truierlands (East Getelands) is spoken.

Getelands (Dutch pronunciation: [ˈɣeːtəlɑnts], Limburgish: Getelandjs [ˈɣeːtəlɑntʃs]) or West Getelands (Dutch: Westgetelands [ʋɛstˈxeːtəlɑnts], Limburgish: Wesgetelandjs [wæsˈxeːtəlɑntʃs]) is a South Brabantian dialect spoken in the eastern part of Flemish Brabant as well as the western part of Limburg in Belgium. It is a transitional dialect between South Brabantian and West Limburgish.

The dialect is named after the river Gete. It is an endangered language.

== Characteristics ==
The first person singular pronoun is typically the Limburgish ich, instead of Brabantian/Standard Dutch ik. The diminutive forms are formed as in Limburgish, using the umlaut. In Truierlands (sometimes called East Getelands), the plural is also formed by using the umlaut (pot /pɔt/ vs. pöt /pœt/), in contrast to Getelands plurals formed the Standard Dutch way (pot /pɒt/ vs. potte /ˈpɒtə/). Both dialects share the lack of pitch accent found in most varieties of Limburgish.

Word accent in the Orsmaal-Gussenhoven dialect shows phonetic features of accent 2 (the dragging tone) of the neighboring West Limburgish dialects.

== Phonology ==
This section shows the phonology of the Orsmaal-Gussenhoven dialect, which is spoken in the Linter municipality. The dialect of Melkwezer has a similar phonology, except for the fact that the diphthong /uɪ/ is realized with a mid onset: [ɔɪ].

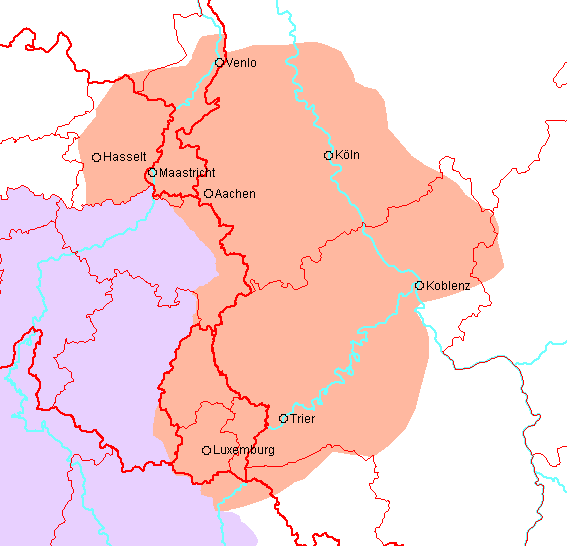
Extent (orange) of pitch usage in Benelux, Germany and France at the beginning of the 20th century

Consonant phonemes
		Labial	Alveolar		Postalveolar	Dorsal		Glottal
		Labial	hard	soft	Postalveolar	hard	soft	Glottal
Nasal		m ⟨m⟩	n ⟨n⟩			ŋ ⟨ng⟩		
Stop	fortis	p ⟨p⟩	t ⟨t⟩	tʲ ⟨tj⟩		k ⟨k⟩	kʲ ⟨kj⟩	
Stop	lenis	b ⟨b⟩	d ⟨d⟩					
Fricative	fortis	f ⟨f⟩	s ⟨s⟩		ʃ ⟨sj⟩	x ⟨ch⟩		
Fricative	lenis	v ⟨v⟩	z ⟨z⟩		ʒ ⟨zj⟩	ɣ ⟨g⟩		ɦ ⟨h⟩
Approximant		w ⟨w⟩	l ⟨l⟩				j ⟨j⟩	
Trill			r ⟨r⟩					

- /ʒ/ is restricted to word-initial position, and occurs only in loanwords from French. It tends to either devoice to [ʃ] or be affricated to [dʒ].
- The exact place of articulation of /x, ɣ/ varies:
  - Velar [x, ɣ̊] before and after back vowels and, in the case of /x/, also when it is preceded by a back vowel in an intervocalic position between stressed and unstressed syllable.
  - Palatal [ç, ʝ̊] before and after front vowels and, in the case of /x/, also after /ə/.
- /ɦ/ may be dropped by some speakers.
- /r/ has a few possible realizations, none of which are uvular. This stands in contrast to most varieties of Limburgish, where /r/ is a uvular trill or fricative.
  - Apical trill [r] or an apical fricative [ɹ̝] before a stressed vowel in word-initial syllables.
  - Intervocalically and in the onset after a consonant, it may be a tap [ɾ].
  - Word-final /r/ is highly variable; the most frequent variants are an apical fricative trill [r̝], an apical fricative [ɹ̝] and an apical non-sibilant affricate [dɹ̝]. The last two variants tend to be voiceless ([ɹ̝̊, tɹ̝̊]) in pre-pausal position.
  - The sequence /ər/ can be vocalized to [ɐ] or [ə].

Monophthongs of the Orsmaal-Gussenhoven dialect, from Peters (2010:241)

Vowel phonemes
		Front				Central		Back	
		unrounded		rounded		Central		Back	
		short	long	short	long	short	long	short	long
Close			iː ⟨ie⟩		yː ⟨uu⟩			u ⟨oe⟩	uː ⟨oê⟩
Close-mid		ɪ ⟨i⟩	eː ⟨ee⟩	ʏ ⟨u⟩	øː ⟨eu⟩	ə ⟨e⟩		ʊ ⟨ó⟩	oː ⟨oo⟩
Open-mid		ɛ ⟨e⟩	ɛː ⟨ae⟩	œ ⟨ö⟩	œː ⟨äö⟩	ə ⟨e⟩		ɒ ⟨o⟩	ɒː ⟨ao⟩
Open						a ⟨a⟩	aː ⟨aa⟩		
Marginal		y ⟨uu⟩ o ⟨oo⟩							
Diphthongs	closing	uɪ ⟨oei⟩ aɪ ⟨ai⟩ aʊ ⟨aw⟩							
Diphthongs	centering	iə ⟨ieë⟩ eə ⟨eë⟩ ɛə ⟨aeë⟩ ɔə ⟨oa⟩							

- Peters gives six more diphthongs, which are [eɪ, øʏ, əʊ, ɛɪ, œʏ, ɔʊ]. He gives no evidence for their phonemic status. As Brabantian dialects are known for both diphthongizing /eː, øː, oː/ and especially monophthongizing /ɛɪ, œʏ, ɔʊ/, the distinction between the closing diphthongs and the monophthongs is ignored elsewhere in the article, with ⟨eː, øː, oː, ɛː, œː, ɒː⟩ being used as cover symbols for both.
- The open central vowels are phonologically back in that they trigger the velar allophones of /x/ and /ɣ/.
- Among the long rounded vowels, /yː, uː, ɒː/ before /t, d/ within the same syllable vary between monophthongs [yː, uː, ɒː] and centering diphthongs [yə, uə, ɒə], which often are disyllabic [ʏy.ə, ʊu.ə, ɒʊ.ə] (with the first portion realized as a closing diphthong). At least in the case of [yə] and [uə], the tongue movement may be so slight that they are sometimes better described as lip-diphthongs [yi, uɯ]. In the same environment, /øː/ can be disyllabic [øʏ.ə]. For the sake of simplicity, those allophones are transcribed [yə, uə, ɒə, øə] in phonetic transcription.
- There are two additional short tense vowels [y] and [o], which are tenser (higher and perhaps also more rounded) than the native short /ʏ, ʊ/ (with the latter being [o̞] phonetically). They appear only in a few French loanwords. Their status as phonemes separate from the long tense /yː/ and /oː/ is unclear; Peters treats them as marginal phonemes.
- /ɔə/ occurs only before alveolar consonants. Phonetically, it varies between [ɔə ~ ɔʊ.ə ~ ɔʌ].
- Stressed short vowels cannot occur in open syllables. Exceptions to this rule are high-frequency words like wa /wa/ 'what' and loanwords from French.

== Bibliography ==
- Belemans, R.; Keulen, R. (2004): Taal in stad en land. Belgisch-Limburgs: 25
- Belemans, R.; Kruijsen, J.; Van Keymeulen, J. (1998): Gebiedsindeling van de zuidelijk-Nederlandse dialecten, Taal en Tongval jg 50, 1 online
- Goossens, J. (1965): Die Gliederung des Südniederfränkischen, in Rheinische Vierteljahrsblätter, 30: 79-94.
- Pauwels, J.L.; Morren, L. (1960): De grens tussen het Brabants en Limburgs in België. In: Zeitschrift für Mundartforschung 27. blz. 88-96.
- Peters, Jörg (2010), "The Flemish–Brabant dialect of Orsmaal–Gussenhoven", Journal of the International Phonetic Association, 40 (2): 239–246, doi:10.1017/S0025100310000083
- Stevens, A. (1978): Struktuur en historische ondergrond van het Haspengouws taallandschap (Mededelingen van de Vereniging voor Limburgse Dialect- en Naamkunde, Nr. 9). Hasselt
