= Finnish phonology =

System of sounds of the Finnish language

Unless otherwise noted, statements in this article refer to Standard Finnish, which is based on the dialect spoken in the former Häme Province in central south Finland. Standard Finnish is used by professional speakers, such as reporters and news presenters on television.

== Vowels ==
Finnish vowel chart, from Suomi, Toivanen & Ylitalo (2008:21)

Finnish monophthong phonemes
	Front				Back	
	unrounded		rounded		Back	
	short	long	short	long	short	long
Close	i	iː	y	yː	u	uː
Mid	e̞	e̞ː	ø̞	ø̞ː	o̞	o̞ː
Open	æ	æː			ɑ	ɑː

- The close vowels /i, y, u/ are similar to the corresponding cardinal vowels [i, y, u].
- The mid vowels are phonetically mid [e̞, ø̞, o̞].
- The open front unrounded vowel /æ/ is phonetically near-open [æ].
- The unrounded open vowel transcribed in IPA with /ɑ/ has been variously described as near-open back [ɑ̝] and open central [ɑ̈].

Finnish has a phonemic contrast between single (/æ e i ø y ɑ o u/) and double (/ææ ee ii øø yy ɑɑ oo uu/) vowels; phonemic double vowels are phonetically long vowels ([æː eː iː øː yː ɑː oː uː]).

=== Diphthongs ===
The table below lists the conventionally postulated diphthongs in Finnish. In speech (i.e. phonetically speaking) a diphthong does not sound like a sequence of two different vowels; instead, the sound of the first vowel gradually glides into the sound of the second one with full vocalization lasting through the whole sound. That is to say, the two portions of the diphthong are not broken by a pause or stress pattern. In Finnish, diphthongs contrast with both long vowels and short vowels. Phonologically, however, Finnish diphthongs are usually analyzed as sequences of two vowels (this in contrast to languages like English, where the diphthongs are best analyzed as independent phonemes).

Diphthongs ending in i can occur in any syllable, but those ending in rounded vowels usually occur only in initial syllables, and rising diphthongs are confined to that syllable. It is usually taught that diphthongization occurs only with the combinations listed. However, there are recognized situations in which other vowel pairs diphthongize. For example, in rapid speech the word yläosa ('upper part', from ylä-, 'upper' + osa, 'part') can be pronounced [ˈylæo̯sɑ] (with the diphthong /æo̯/). The usual pronunciation is [ˈylæ.ˌosɑ] (with those vowels belonging to separate syllables).

Diphthongs	Ending with /i/	Ending with /u/	Ending with /y/	Opening diphthongs
Starting with /ɑ/	⟨ai⟩ [ɑi̯]	⟨au⟩ [ɑu̯]		
Starting with /æ/	⟨äi⟩ [æi̯]		⟨äy⟩ [æy̯]	
Starting with /o/	⟨oi⟩ [oi̯]	⟨ou⟩ [ou̯]		
Starting with /e/	⟨ei⟩ [ei̯]	⟨eu⟩ [eu̯]	⟨ey⟩ [ey̯]	
Starting with /ø/	⟨öi⟩ [øi̯]		⟨öy⟩ [øy̯]	
Starting with /u/	⟨ui⟩ [ui̯]			⟨uo⟩ [uo̯]
Starting with /i/		⟨iu⟩ [iu̯]	⟨iy⟩ [iy̯]	⟨ie⟩ [ie̯]
Starting with /y/	⟨yi⟩ [yi̯]			⟨yö⟩ [yø̯]

The diphthongs [ey̯] and [iy̯] are quite rare and mostly found in derivative words, where a derivational affix starting with /y/ (or properly the vowel harmonic archiphoneme /U/) fuses with the preceding vowel, e.g. pimeys 'darkness' from pimeä 'dark' + /-(U)US/ '-ness' and siistiytyä 'to tidy up oneself' from siisti 'tidy' + /-UTU/ (a kind of middle voice) + /-(d)A/ (infinitive suffix). Older /*ey̯/ and /*iy̯/ in initial syllables have been shifted to [øy̯] and [yː].

Opening diphthongs are in standard Finnish only found in root-initial syllables like in words tietää 'to know', takapyörä 'rear wheel' (from taka- 'back, rear' + pyörä 'wheel'; the latter part is secondarily stressed) or luo 'towards'. This might make them easier to pronounce as true opening diphthongs [uo̯, ie̯, yø̯] (in some accents even wider opening [uɑ̯, iɑ̯~iæ̯, yæ̯] (Note: In these dialects, ie may be reflected as either [iɑ̯] or [iæ̯] depending on vowel harmony.)) and not as centering diphthongs [uə̯, iə̯, yə̯], which are more common in the world's languages. The opening diphthongs come from earlier doubled mid vowels: /*oo/ > [uo̯], /*ee/ > [ie̯], /*øø/ > [yø̯]. Since that time new doubled mid vowels have come to the language from various sources.

Among the phonological processes operating in Finnish dialects are diphthongization and diphthong reduction. For example, Savo Finnish has the phonemic contrast of /ɑ/ vs. /uɑ̯/ vs. /ɑɑ/ instead of standard language contrast of /ɑ/ vs. /ɑɑ/ vs. /ɑu̯/.

=== Vowel harmony ===
A diagram illustrating the vowel groups in Finnish.

Finnish, like many other Uralic languages, has the phenomenon called vowel harmony, which restricts the cooccurrence in a word of vowels belonging to different articulatory subgroups. Vowels within a word "harmonize" to be either all front or all back. In particular, no native noncompound word can contain vowels from the group {a, o, u} together with vowels from the group {ä, ö, y}. Vowel harmony affects inflectional suffixes and derivational suffixes, which have two forms, one for use with back vowels, and the other with front vowels. Compare, for example, the following pair of abstract nouns: hallitus 'government' (from hallita, 'to reign') versus terveys 'health' (from terve, healthy).

There are exceptions to the constraint of vowel harmony. For one, there are two front vowels that lack back counterparts: /i/ and /e/. Therefore, words like kello 'clock' (with a front vowel in a non-final syllable) and tuuli 'wind' (with a front vowel in the final syllable), which contain /i/ or /e/ together with a back vowel, count as back vowel words; /i/ and /e/ are effectively neutral in regard to vowel harmony in such words. Kello and tuuli yield the inflectional forms kellossa 'in a clock' and tuulessa 'in a wind'. In words containing only neutral vowels, front vowel harmony is used, e.g. tie – tiellä ('road' – 'on the road'). For another, compound words do not have vowel harmony across the compound boundary; e.g. seinäkello 'wall clock' (from seinä, 'wall' and kello, 'clock') has back /o/ cooccurring with front /æ/. In the case of compound words, the choice between back and front suffix alternants is determined by the immediately-preceding element of the compound; e.g. 'in a wall clock' is seinäkellossa, not *seinäkellossä.

A particular exception appears in a standard Finnish word, tällainen ('this kind of'). Although by definition a singular word, it was originally a compound word that transitioned over time to a more compact and easier form: tämänlajinen (from tämän, 'of this' and lajinen, 'kind') → tänlainen → tällainen, and in colloquial speech sometimes further to tällä(i)nen.

New loan words may exhibit vowel disharmony; for example, olympialaiset ('Olympic games') and sekundäärinen ('secondary') have both front and back vowels. In standard Finnish, these words are pronounced as they are spelled, but many speakers apply vowel harmony – olumpialaiset, and sekundaarinen or sekyndäärinen.

== Consonants ==
		Labial	Dental/ Alveolar	Palatal (-alveolar)	Velar	Glottal
Nasal		m	n		ŋ	
Plosive	voiceless	p	t̪		k	
Plosive	voiced	(b)	d		(ɡ)	
Fricative		(f)	s	(ʃ)		h
Approximant		ʋ	l	j		
Trill			r			

- For some speakers, /t/ can be dental [t̪], whereas /n/ and /d/ are alveolar. The contrast between /t/ and /d/ is not a voicing distinction, but rather a contrast in place as well as duration of occlusion. However, /n/ is dental before /t/.
- /d/ may sometimes be closer to a tap [ɾ] than a true plosive [d], and the dialectal realization varies widely; it is increasingly common to pronounce it as a true plosive, however. See the section below. In native vocabulary it is the equivalent of /t/ under weakening consonant gradation, and thus it occurs only word-medially, either by itself (e.g. sade 'rain'; cf. sataa 'to rain') or in the cluster /hd/ (e.g. lähde 'fountain, spring, source'; cf. lähteä 'to depart'). In recent loanwords and technical vocabulary the sound can occur somewhat freely (e.g. addiktio, adverbi, anekdootti, bulevardi, demoni, formaldehydi, sandaali), likewise in slang vocabulary (e.g. dorka 'idiot', kondis 'condition').
- /s/ is frequently retracted alveolar [s̠].
- A glottal stop [ʔ] can appear at certain morpheme boundaries, the same ones as the gemination described further down as a result of certain sandhi phenomena, and it is not normally indicated in spelling at the end of a word: e.g. [ɑnnɑʔːollɑ] 'let it be', orthographically anna olla. Moreover, this sound is not used in all dialects. However, word-internally, it can be indicated by an apostrophe, which can occur when a k is lost between similar vowels, e.g. vaaka 'scales' → vaa'at 'scales (nom.pl.)'.
- The velar nasal /ŋ/ is also heavily limited in occurrence in native vocabulary: it is found only word-medially, either in the consonant cluster /ŋk/ (written nk), or as geminate /ŋŋ/ (written ng), the latter being the counterpart of the former under consonant gradation (type of lenition). In recent loanwords /ŋ/ may also occur in other environments; e.g. magneetti /mɑŋneetti/, pingviini /piŋʋiini/. Spellings with ng /ŋ/ and gn /ŋn/ do not indicate the presence of the phoneme /ɡ/ - instead, they are used because there's no separate letter for /ŋ/.
- /ʋ/ "is often accompanied by a somewhat ballistic lower-lip gesture, producing something like a labiodental flap."
- /r/ may sometimes be pronounced as a tap or flap [ɾ], especially between vowels in rapid speech.
- [f] does not appear in native phonology; however, it exists in the variation between foreign-origin geminate /ff/ and native consonant cluster /hʋ/ in many loanwords, retrogradely occurring also in the native word ahven 'perch' in some southwestern dialects (dialectal as ahvena [ˈɑɦʋenɑ] ~ affena [ˈɑfːenɑ]). Generally, f is reliably distinguished by Finnish speakers, but other foreign fricatives are not.
- [ʃ] š or sh appears only in non-native words, usually pronounced [s], although some speakers make a distinction between e.g. šakki 'chess' and sakki 'a gang (of people)'.
- The orthography also includes the letters z and ž, although their use is marginal, and they have no phonemic status. For example, azeri and džonkki may be pronounced [ɑseri] and [tsoŋkki] without fear of confusion. The letter z, found mostly in foreign words and names such as Zulu, is most often pronounced as [ts] following the influence of German, thus Zulu /tsulu/.
- The phoneme /h/ has glottal (voiceless and voiced) and fricative allophones. At the end of a syllable before a voiceless consonant it may be pronounced as a fricative whose place of articulation is similar to the preceding vowel: velar [x] after a back vowel (/a o u/), palatal [ç] after a high front vowel (/i y/). In voiced context, a breathy voiced or murmured /ɦ/ usually occur:
  - vihma [ˈʋiɦmɑ], lyhty [ˈlyhty] or [ˈlyçty]
  - mahti [ˈmɑhti] or [ˈmɑxti], kohme [ˈkoɦme], tuhka [ˈtuhkɑ] or [ˈtuxkɑ]
  - maha [ˈmɑɦɑ]

=== Voiced plosives ===
Traditionally, /b/ and /ɡ/ were not counted as Finnish phonemes, since they appear only in loanwords. However, these borrowings being relatively common, they are nowadays considered part of the educated norm. The failure to use them correctly is often ridiculed in the media, e.g. if a news reporter or a high official consistently and publicly realises Belgia ('Belgium') as Pelkia. Even many educated speakers, however, still make no distinction between voiced and voiceless plosives in regular speech if there is no fear of confusion. Minimal pairs do exist: /bussi/ 'a bus' vs. /pussi/ 'a bag', /ɡorillɑ/ 'a gorilla' vs. /korillɑ/ 'on a basket'.

The status of /d/ is somewhat different from /b/ and /ɡ/, since it also appears in native Finnish words, as a regular 'weak' correspondence of the voiceless /t/ (see Consonant gradation below). Historically, this sound was a fricative, [ð], varyingly spelled as d or dh in Old Literary Finnish (which is based on southwestern dialects), and realised in native dialects with significantly large allophony of frontal consonants or even completely degraded depending on the dialectal gradation features. Its realization as a plosive originated as a spelling pronunciation, in part because when mass elementary education was instituted in Finland, the spelling d in Finnish texts was mispronounced as a plosive, under the influence of how Swedish speakers would pronounce this letter. (Note: In the close to seven centuries during which Finland was under first Swedish, then Russian rule, Swedish speakers dominated the government and economy.) Initially, few native speakers of Finnish acquired the foreign plosive realisation of the native phoneme. As for loanwords, /d/ was often assimilated to /t/ as a strong grade consonant. Even well into the 20th century it was not entirely exceptional to hear loanwords like deodorantti ('a deodorant') pronounced as teotorantti, while native Finnish words with a /d/ were pronounced in the usual dialectal way. Due to diffusion of the standard language through mass media and basic education, and due to the dialectal prestige of the capital area, the plosive [d] can now be heard in all parts of the country, at least in loanwords and in formal speech.

=== Consonant gradation ===
Consonant gradation in Finnish involves alternations between a "strong grade" and a "weak grade" of consonants, influenced by both phonological and grammatical factors. Historically, a consonant would shift to its weak grade if it was part of a closed syllable. However, due to language evolution, there are now instances where the weak grade may or may not appear regardless of the syllable being open or closed, such as in "Turkuun" where the strong grade appears in a closed syllable. Grammatically, the weak grade typically shows up in nouns, pronouns, and adjectives before case suffixes, and in verbs before person agreement suffixes.

The following is a general list of strong–weak correspondences.

Strong	Weak
/pː tː kː/	/p t k/
/p t k/	/ʋ d̮ ∅~j~ʋ/
/mp nt ŋk/	/mː nː ŋː/
/lt rt/	/lː rː/

=== Other consonant alternations ===
Many of the remaining "irregular" patterns of Finnish noun and verb inflection are explained by a change of a historical *ti to /si/. The change from *ti to /si/, a type of assibilation, is unconnected to consonant gradation, and dates back as early as Proto-Finnic. In modern Finnish the alternation is not productive, due to new cases of the sequence /ti/ having been introduced by later sound changes and loanwords, and assibilation therefore occurs only in certain morphologically defined positions.

Words having this particular alternation are still subject to consonant gradation in forms that lack assibilation. Thus Finnish nouns of this type could be seen as having up to five distinct stems: a word such as vesi 'water (sg. nom.)' has the forms veden (sg. gen.), vettä (sg. part.), veteen (sg. ill.) vesiä (pl. part.); as can be seen from the examples the change from t to s has only occurred in front of i. When a vowel other than i occurs, words like vesi inflect just like other nouns with a single t alternating with the consonant gradated d. Alternatively, Kiparsky proposes that all Finnish stems must end in a vowel, which in the case of polysyllabic stems may then be deleted when adding certain affixes and certain other conditions are fulfilled. For vesi he proposes the stem /vete/ (with stem final -e), which when combined with the partitive singular affix -tä/-ta drops the -e to become vet-tä (sg. part.).

This pattern has, however, been reverted in some cases. Variation appears in particular in past tense verb forms, e.g. kieltää, kielsi ('to deny', 'denied') but säätää, sääti ('to adjust', 'adjusted'). Both alternate forms (kielti and sääsi) can also be found in dialects. Apparently this was caused by word pairs such as noutaa, nouti ('bring') and nousta, nousi ('rise'), which were felt important enough to keep them contrastive.

Assibilation occurred prior to the change of the original consonants cluster *kt to /ht/, which can be seen in the inflection of the numerals yksi, kaksi and yhden, kahden.

In many recent loanwords, there is vacillation between representing an original voiceless consonant as single or geminate: this is the case for example kalsium (~ kalssium) and kantarelli (~ kanttarelli). The orthography generally favors the single form, if it exists. (More completely assimilated loans such as farssi, minuutti, ooppera generally have settled on geminates.)

== Length ==
All phonemes except /ʋ/ and /j/ can occur doubled phonemically as a phonetic increase in length. Consonant doubling always occurs at the boundary of a syllable in accordance with the rules of Finnish syllable structure.

Some example sets of words:

tuli 'fire'/'s/he came', tuuli 'wind', tulli 'customs'
muta 'mud', mutaa 'mud' (partitive sg.), muuta 'other' (partitive sg.), mutta 'but', muuttaa 'to change' or 'to move'

A double /h/ is rare in standard Finnish, but possible, e.g. hihhuli, a derogatory term for a religious fanatic. In some dialects, e.g. Savo, it is common: rahhoo, or standard Finnish rahaa 'money' (in the partitive case). The distinction between /d/ and /dd/ is found only in foreign words; natively 'd' occurs only in the short form. While /ʋ/ and /j/ may appear as geminates when spoken (e.g. vauva [ʋɑuʋːɑ], raijata [rɑijːɑtɑ]), this distinction is not phonemic, and is not indicated in spelling.

== Phonotactics ==
The phonemic template of a syllable in Finnish is (C)V(C)(C), in which C can be an obstruent or a liquid consonant. V can be realized as a doubled vowel or a diphthong. A final consonant of a Finnish word, though not a syllable, must be a coronal one; Standard Finnish does not allow final clusters of two consonants.

Originally Finnish syllables could not start with two consonants but many loans containing these have added this to the inventory. This is observable in older loans such as ranska < Swedish franska ('French') contrasting newer loans presidentti < Swedish president ('president'). In past decades, it was common to hear these clusters simplified in speech (resitentti), particularly, though not exclusively, by either rural Finns or Finns who knew little or no Swedish or English. Even then, the Southwestern dialects formed an exception: consonant clusters, especially those with plosives, trills or nasals, are common: examples include place names Friitala and Preiviiki near the town Pori, or town Kristiinankaupunki ('Kristinestad'). Nowadays the overwhelming majority of Finns have adopted initial consonant clusters in their speech.

=== Consonant phonotactics ===
Consonant phonotactics are as follows.

Word-final consonants

- Only /t, s, n, r, l/.
- Glottal stop [ʔ] occurs almost exclusively at word boundaries, replacing what used to be word-final consonants /k/ and /h/.

Word-initial consonants

- All consonants may occur word initially, except /d/ and /ŋ/ (although an initial /d/ may be found in loan words).

Word-initial consonant clusters

- No consonant clusters in native words, various consonant clusters in modern loanwords (e.g. /klinikkɑ/ = 'clinic', /psykoloɡiɑ/ = 'psychology', /stɑtistiikkɑ/ = 'statistics', /strɑteɡiɑ/ = 'strategy').

Word-final consonant clusters

- None, except in dialects via vowel dropping.

Word-medial consonant clusters

- The following clusters are not possible:
  - any exceeding 3 consonants (except in loan words)
  - stop + nasal
  - labial stop + non-labial stop
  - non-dental stop + semivowel
  - nasal + non-homorganic obstruent (except /nh/)
  - nasal + sonorant
  - liquid + liquid
  - semivowel + consonant

=== Vowel phonotactics ===
Vowel phonotactics are as follows.

Word-final and word-initial vowels

- Any of the vowels can be found in this position.

Vowel sequences

- Doubled vowels
  - Usually only the vowels /ɑ, æ, i, y, u/ are doubled.
  - Sometimes the mid vowels /e, o, ø/ can be doubled in cases of contraction.
- Diphthongs
  - Of the 18 diphthongs, 15 are formed from any vowel followed by a close vowel. The 3 exceptions are /uo, yø, ie/.
- Vowel combinations
  - Approximately 20 combinations, always at syllable boundaries.
  - Unlike diphthongs, the second vowel is longer, as is expected, and it can be open /ɑ/ or /æ/.
  - Sometimes 3–4 vowels can occur in a sequence if a medial consonant has disappeared.

/ee/, /oo/ and /øø/ are allowed by phonotactics, but they are rare because they underwent a sound change in Proto-Finnic to /ie/, /uo/ and /yø/. They have been reintroduced in loanwords (e.g. peesata, hoonata, amatööri).

== Prosody ==
=== Stress ===
Stress in Finnish is non-phonemic. Like Hungarian and Icelandic, Finnish primary stress always occurs on the first syllable of a word. Secondary stress normally falls on odd-numbered syllables. Contrary to primary stress, Finnish secondary stress is quantity-sensitive. Thus, if secondary stress would normally fall on a light (CV) syllable but this is followed by a heavy syllable (CVV or CVC), the secondary stress moves one syllable further ("to the right"), and the preceding foot (syllable group) therefore contains three syllables. Thus, omenanani 'as my apple' contains light syllables only and has primary stress on the first syllable and secondary on the third, as expected: ómenànani. On the other hand, omenanamme 'as our apple' has a light third syllable (-na-) and a heavy fourth syllable (-nam-), so secondary stress falls on the fourth syllable: ómenanàmme.

Certain Finnish dialects also have a quantity-sensitive main stress pattern, but instead of moving the initial stress, they geminate the consonant, so that e.g. light-heavy CV.CVV becomes heavy-heavy CVC.CVV, e.g. the partitive form of 'fish' is pronounced kalaa in the quantity-insensitive dialects, but kallaa in the quantity-sensitive ones (compare also the examples in the "Length" section).

Secondary stress falls on the first syllable of non-initial parts of compounds, e.g. the compound puunaama 'wooden face' (from puu 'tree' and naama 'face'), is pronounced [ˈpuːˌnɑː.mɑ], but puunaama 'which was cleaned' (preceded by an agent in the genitive, 'by someone') is pronounced [ˈpuː.nɑː.mɑ].

=== Timing ===
Finnish is not really isochronic at any level. For example, huutelu ('shouting') and huuhtelu ('flushing') are distinct words, where the initial syllables huu- and huuh- are of different length. Additionally, acoustic measurements show that the first syllable of a word is longer in duration than other syllables, in addition to its phonological doubling, unless it is an open syllable containing a short vowel in which case the second syllable has a longer duration.

== Sandhi ==
Finnish sandhi is extremely frequent, appearing between many words and morphemes, in formal standard language and in everyday spoken language. In most registers, it is never written down; only dialectal transcriptions preserve it, the rest settling for a morphemic notation. There are two processes. The first is simple assimilation with respect to place of articulation (e.g. np > mp). The second is predictive gemination of initial consonants on morpheme boundaries.

Simple phonetic incomplete assimilations include:

- /n + k/ → /ŋk/, velarization due to 'k', e.g. sen kanssa /seŋ kɑnssɑ/
- /n + p/ → /mp/, labialization due to 'p' e.g. menenpä /menempæ/
- /V + V/ → [VʔV], dissimilation of a sequence of individual vowels (compared to diphthongs) by adding a glottal stop, e.g. kuorma-auto [kuo̯rmɑʔɑu̯to] (not obligatory)

Gemination of a morpheme-initial consonant occurs when the morpheme preceding it ends in a vowel and belongs to one of certain morphological classes. Gemination or a tendency of a morpheme to cause gemination is sometimes indicated with an apostrophe or a superscripted "x", e.g. vene /ʋeneˣ/. Examples of gemination:

- most nouns ending in -e (apart from some new loanwords), specifically those with the singular partitive ending in -tta/-ttä

e.g. hakelava [hɑkelːɑʋɑ] ('open-box bed for wood chips')

- imperatives and connegative imperatives of the second-person singular, as well as the connegative form of the present indicative (these three are always similar to each other)

e.g. osta vene [ostɑʋːene] ('buy a boat')

- connegative imperatives of the third-person singular, first-person plural, second-person plural, third-person plural and passive

älkää tehkökään sitä [tehkøkːæːn] ('actually, don't do it')

- connegative forms of present passive indicative verbs

ei otetakaan sitä [otetɑkːɑːn] ('it will not be taken after all', colloquially 'we won't take it after all')

- connegative forms of present potential verbs (including passive)

en tehnekään sitä [tehnekːæːn] ('I probably will not do it (after all)', formal or poetic speech)

- first infinitives (the dictionary form)

e.g. täytyy mennä käymään [tæy̯tyːmenːækːæy̯mæːn]

- noun cases in -e: allative -lle as well as the more marginal sublative -nne (as in tänne) and prolative -tse (as in postitse) and (only for some speakers) the comitative for adjectives, when it is not followed by a possessive suffix
- adverbs ending in -sti, -lti and -ti
- the possessive suffix of the third person -nsa/-nsä
- some other words such as luo ('to, towards [a person or place]'), kiinni, ala, taa, kai 'probably', tai 'or', (only for some speakers) itse 'self'

The gemination can occur between morphemes of a single word as in /minulle/ + /kin/ → [minulːekːin] ('to me too'; orthographically minullekin), between parts of a compound word as in /perhe/ + /pɑlɑʋeri/ → [perhepːɑlɑʋeri] ('family meeting'; orthographically perhepalaveri), or between separate words as in /tule/ + /tænne/ → [tuletːænːe] ('come here!'). In elaborate standard language, the gemination affects even morphemes with a vowel beginning: /otɑ/ + /omenɑ/ → [otɑʔːomenɑ] or [otɑʔomenɑ] ('take an apple!'). In casual speech, this is however often rendered as [otɑomenɑ] without a glottal stop.

These rules are generally valid for the standard language, although many Southwestern dialects, for instance, do not recognise the phenomenon at all. Even in the standard language there is idiolectal variation (disagreement between different speakers); e.g. whether kolme ('three') should cause a gemination of the following initial consonant or not: [kolmeʋɑristɑ] or [kolmeʋːɑristɑ] ('three crows'). Both forms occur and neither one of them is standardised, since in any case it does not affect writing. In some dictionaries compiled for foreigners or linguists, however, the tendency of geminating the following consonant is marked by a superscript x as in perhe^{x}.

Historically, morpheme-boundary gemination is the result of regressive assimilation. The preceding word originally ended in /h/ or /k/. For instance, the modern Finnish word for 'boat' vene used to be veneh (a form still existing in the closely related Karelian language). At some point in time, these /h/ and /k/s were assimilated by the initial consonant of a following word, e.g. veneh kulkevi' ('the boat is moving'). Here we get the modern Finnish form [ʋenekːulkeː] (orthographically vene kulkee), even though the independent form [ʋene] has no sign of the old final consonant /h/.

In many Finnish dialects, including that of Helsinki, the gemination at morpheme boundaries has become more widespread due to the loss of additional final consonants, which appear only as gemination of the following consonant, cf. French liaison. For example, the standard word for 'now' nyt has lost its t and become ny in Helsinki speech. However, /ny/ + /se/ ('now it [does something]') is pronounced [nysːe] and not *[nyse] (although the latter would be permissible in the dialect of Turku).

Similar remnants of a lost word-final /n/ can be seen in dialects, where e.g. the genitive form of the first singular pronoun is regularly /mu/ (standard language minun): /se/ + /on/ + /mu/ → [seomːu] ('it is mine'). Preceding an approximant, the /n/ is completely assimilated: [muʋːɑi̯mo] ('my wife'). Preceding a vowel, however, the /n/ however appears in a different form: /mu/ + /omɑ/ → [munomɑ] or even [munːomɑ] ('my own').

== See also ==
- Finnish orthography
