= Mid back rounded vowel =

Vowel sound represented by ⟨o̞⟩ or ⟨ɔ̝⟩ in IPA

o̞

ɔ̝
- IPA number: 307 430

Audio sample
- source · help

Encoding
- Entity (decimal): &#111;&#798;
- Unicode (hex): U+006F U+031E
- Braille: ⠕ (braille pattern dots-135) ⠠ (braille pattern dots-6) ⠣ (braille pattern dots-126)

IPA: Vowels

	Front	Central	Back
Close	i y	ɨ ʉ	ɯ u
Near-close	ɪ ʏ		ʊ
Close-mid	e ø	ɘ ɵ	ɤ o
Mid	e̞ ø̞	ə	ɤ̞ o̞
Open-mid	ɛ œ	ɜ ɞ	ʌ ɔ
Near-open	æ	ɐ
Open	a ɶ	ä	ɑ ɒ

- IPA help
- audio
- full chart
- template

Legend: unrounded • rounded

The mid back rounded vowel is a type of vowel sound, used in some spoken languages. While there is no dedicated symbol in the International Phonetic Alphabet that represents the exact mid back rounded vowel between close-mid [o] and open-mid [ɔ], it is normally written ⟨o⟩. If precision is desired, diacritics may be used, such as ⟨o̞⟩ or ⟨ɔ̝⟩, the former being more common.

Multiple para-IPA alternative symbols also exist for this vowel. The Swedish Dialect Alphabet uses the symbol ⟨ⱺ⟩ (an o with low ring), while Sinological notation uses the symbol ⟨o̧⟩ (an o with cedilla). The symbol ⟨ꭥ⟩ (a small capital omega) was proposed for Americanist notation, but was never implemented.

Just because a language has only one non-close non-open back vowel, it still may not be a true-mid vowel. Tukang Besi is a language in Sulawesi, Indonesia, with a close-mid [o]. Taba, another language in Indonesia, in the Maluku Islands, has an open-mid [ɔ]. In both languages, there is no contrast with another mid (true-mid or close-mid) vowel.

Kensiu, in Malaysia and Thailand, is highly unusual in that it contrasts true-mid vowels with close-mid and open-mid vowels without any difference in other parameters, such as backness or roundedness.

Some of the vowels listed in the table below may phonetically be more front than typical back vowels, as near-back vowels. If precision is required, this may instead be called a mid near-back rounded vowel.

== Features ==
- Its vowel height is mid, which means the tongue is positioned halfway between a close vowel and an open vowel.
- Its vowel backness is back, which means the tongue is positioned back in the mouth without creating a constriction that would be classified as a consonant.
- Its roundedness is protruded, which means that the corners of the lips are drawn together, and the inner surfaces exposed.

== Occurrence ==
Language		Word	IPA	Meaning	Notes
Afrikaans	Standard	bok	[bɔ̝k]	'goat'	Typically transcribed in IPA with ⟨ɔ⟩. The height varies between mid [ɔ̝] and close-mid [o]. See Afrikaans phonology
Arabic	Hejazi	لـون	[lo̞ːn]	'color'	See Hejazi Arabic phonology
Bengali		তোমার	[to̞mɐr]	ˈyour'	May be closer to close-mid [o]. See Bengali phonology
Breton					Possible realization of unstressed /ɔ/; can be open-mid [ɔ] or close-mid [o] instead.
Catalan	Modern Algherese	soc	[ˈs̺ɔ̝k]	'clog'	Open-mid and close-mid vowels merge into mid vowels. See Catalan phonology
Catalan	Northern	soc	[ˈs̺ɔ̝k]	'clog'	Open-mid and close-mid vowels merge into mid vowels. See Catalan phonology
Catalan	Some speakers	soc	[ˈs̺ɔ̝k]	'clog'	Open-mid and close-mid vowels merge into mid vowels. Found in some places bordering the Aragonese and Spanish-speaking areas. A five to six vowel system (i.e. without /ɛ/ and/or /ɔ/), can be found in some areas.
Chinese	Mandarin	我 / wǒ	[wo̞ɔː˨˩˦]	'I'	See Standard Chinese phonology
Chinese	Shanghainese	高/kò	[kö̞¹]	'tall'	Near-back. Realization of /ɔ/ in open syllables and /ʊ/ in closed syllables.
Czech		oko	[ˈo̞ko̞]	'eye'	In Bohemian Czech, the backness varies between back and near-back, whereas the height varies between mid [o̞] and close-mid [o]. See Czech phonology
Danish	Standard	måle	[ˈmɔ̽ːlə]	'measure'	Near-back; typically transcribed in IPA with ⟨ɔː⟩. See Danish phonology
Dutch	Amsterdam	och	[ɔ̝̈χ]	'alas'	Near-back; corresponds to open-mid [ɔˤ] in standard Dutch. See Dutch phonology
Dutch	Orsmaal-Gussenhoven dialect	mot	[mɔ̝t]	'well'	Typically transcribed in IPA with ⟨ɔ⟩.
English	Cultivated South African	thought	[θɔ̝ːt]	'thought'	Close-mid [oː] for other speakers. See South African English phonology
English	Maori	thought	[θɔ̝ːt]	'thought'	Near-close [o̝ː] in General New Zealand English.
English	Scouse	thought	[θɔ̝ːt]	'thought'	Typically transcribed in IPA with ⟨ɔː⟩.
English	Some Cardiff speakers	thought	[θɔ̝ːt]	'thought'	Other speakers use a more open, advanced and unrounded vowel [ʌ̈ː].
English	General American	Cambodia	[kʰɛəmˈbö̞diə]	'Cambodia'	Near-back; often diphthongal: [ö̞ʊ]. Some regional North American varieties use a vowel that is closer to cardinal [o]. See English phonology
English	Yorkshire	Cambodia	[kʰamˈbo̞ːdjə]	'Cambodia'	Corresponds to /əʊ/ in other British dialects. See English phonology
Faroese		toldi	[ˈtʰɔ̝ltɪ̞]	'endured'	Typically transcribed in IPA with ⟨ɔ⟩. See Faroese phonology
Finnish		kello	[ˈke̞lːo̞]	'clock'	See Finnish phonology
French	Parisian	pont	[pɔ̝̃]	'bridge'	Nasalized; typically transcribed in IPA with ⟨ɔ̃⟩. See French phonology
German	Southern accents	voll	[fɔ̝l]	'full'	Common realization of /ɔ/ in Southern Germany, Switzerland and Austria. Open-mid [ɔ] in Northern Standard German. See Standard German phonology
German	Western Swiss accents	hoch	[ho̞ːχ]	'high'	Close-mid [oː] in other accents. See Standard German phonology
Greek	Modern Standard	πως / pos	[po̞s̠]	'how'	See Modern Greek phonology
Hebrew		שלום/shalom/šɔlom	[ʃäˈlo̞m]	'peace'	Hebrew vowels are not shown in the script. See Niqqud and Modern Hebrew phonology
Ibibio		do	[dó̞]	'there'	
Icelandic		loft	[ˈlɔ̝ft]	'air'	Typically transcribed in IPA with ⟨ɔ⟩. The long allophone is often diphthongized to [oɔ]. See Icelandic phonology
Inuit	West Greenlandic	Maniitsoq	[maniːtsːo̞q]	'Maniitsoq'	Allophone of /u/ before and especially between uvulars. See Greenlandic phonology
Italian	Standard	forense	[fo̞ˈrɛnse]	'forensic'	Common realization of the unstressed /o/. See Italian phonology
Italian	Northern accents	bosco	[ˈbo̞sko̞]	'forest'	Local realization of /ɔ/. See Italian phonology
Japanese		子/ko	[ko̞]	'child'	See Japanese phonology
Korean		보리 / bori	[po̞ˈɾi]	'barley'	See Korean phonology
Limburgish	Hasselt dialect	mok	[mɔ̝k]	'mug'	May be transcribed IPA with ⟨ɔ⟩. See Hasselt dialect phonology
Malay	Standard	ڤوكوق / pokok	[po̞.ko̞ʔ]	'tree'	See Malay phonology
Malay	Johor-Riau	ڤوكوق / pokok	[po̞.ko̞ʔ]	'tree'	See Malay phonology
Norwegian	Urban East	lov	[lo̞ːʋ]	'law'	Also described as close-mid [oː]. See Norwegian phonology
Romanian		acolo	[äˈko̞lo̞]	'there'	See Romanian phonology
Russian		сухой/sukhoy/sukhoj	[s̪ʊˈxo̞j]	'dry'	Some speakers realize it as open-mid [ɔ]. See Russian phonology
Scottish Gaelic	Lewis	ruadh	[rˠʊɔ̝̈ɣ]	'red'	Near-back and weakly rounded; allophone of [ə] in the /uə/ diphthong.
Serbo-Croatian		ко̑д / kȏd/kõd	[kô̞ːd̪]	'code'	See Serbo-Croatian phonology
Shipibo		koni	[ˈkö̞ni̞]	'eel'	Near-back.
Slovene		oglas	[o̞ˈɡlá̠s̪]	'advertisement'	Unstressed vowel, as well as an allophone of /o/ before /ʋ/ when a vowel does not follow within the same word. See Slovene phonology
Spanish		todo	[ˈt̪o̞ð̞o̞]	'all'	See Spanish phonology
Tera		zo	[zo̞ː]	'rope'	
Thai		โต	[to̞ː˧]	'big'	See Thai phonology
Turkish		kol	[kʰo̞ɫ]	'arm'	See Turkish phonology
Zapotec	Tilquiapan	do	[d̪o̞]	'corn tassel'	

== Notes ==
Place →	Labial					Coronal										Dorsal					Laryngeal			
Manner ↓	Bilabial		Labiodental		Linguolabial		Dental		Alveolar		Postalveolar		Retroflex		(Alveolo-)palatal		Velar		Uvular		Pharyngeal/epiglottal		Glottal	
Nasal	m̥	m	ɱ̊	ɱ		n̼	n̪̊	n̪	n̥	n	n̠̊	n̠	ɳ̊	ɳ	ɲ̊	ɲ	ŋ̊	ŋ	ɴ̥	ɴ				
Plosive	p	b	p̪	b̪	t̼	d̼	t̪	d̪	t	d			ʈ	ɖ	c	ɟ	k	ɡ	q	ɢ	ʡ		ʔ	
Sibilant affricate							t̪s̪	d̪z̪	ts	dz	t̠ʃ	d̠ʒ	tʂ	dʐ	tɕ	dʑ								
Non-sibilant affricate	pɸ	bβ	p̪f	b̪v			t̪θ	d̪ð	tɹ̝̊	dɹ̝	t̠ɹ̠̊˔	d̠ɹ̠˔			cç	ɟʝ	kx	ɡɣ	qχ	ɢʁ	ʡʜ	ʡʢ	ʔh	
Sibilant fricative							s̪	z̪	s	z	ʃ	ʒ	ʂ	ʐ	ɕ	ʑ								
Non-sibilant fricative	ɸ	β	f	v	θ̼	ð̼	θ	ð	θ̠	ð̠	ɹ̠̊˔	ɹ̠˔	ɻ̊˔	ɻ˔	ç	ʝ	x	ɣ	χ	ʁ	ħ	ʕ	h	ɦ
Approximant		β̞		ʋ				ð̞		ɹ		ɹ̠		ɻ		j		ɰ						˷
Tap/flap		ⱱ̟		ⱱ					ɾ̥	ɾ			ɽ̊	ɽ						ɢ̆		ʡ̆		
Trill	ʙ̥	ʙ							r̥	r		r̠	ɽ̊r̥	ɽr					ʀ̥	ʀ	ʜ	ʢ		
Lateral affricate									tɬ	dɮ			tꞎ	d𝼅	c𝼆	ɟʎ̝	k𝼄	ɡʟ̝						
Lateral fricative							ɬ̪		ɬ	ɮ			ꞎ	𝼅	𝼆	ʎ̝	𝼄	ʟ̝						
Lateral approximant								l̪	l̥	l		l̠	ɭ̊	ɭ	ʎ̥	ʎ	ʟ̥	ʟ		ʟ̠				
Lateral tap/flap									ɺ̥	ɺ			𝼈̊	𝼈		ʎ̆		ʟ̆						

		BL	LD	D	A	PA	RF	P	V	U
Implosive	Voiced	ɓ			ɗ		ᶑ	ʄ	ɠ	ʛ
Implosive	Voiceless	ɓ̥			ɗ̥		ᶑ̊	ʄ̊	ɠ̊	ʛ̥
Ejective	Stop	pʼ			tʼ		ʈʼ	cʼ	kʼ	qʼ
Ejective	Affricate		p̪fʼ	t̪θʼ	tsʼ	t̠ʃʼ	tʂʼ	tɕʼ	kxʼ	qχʼ
Ejective	Fricative	ɸʼ	fʼ	θʼ	sʼ	ʃʼ	ʂʼ	ɕʼ	xʼ	χʼ
Ejective	Lateral affricate				tɬʼ			c𝼆ʼ	k𝼄ʼ	q𝼄ʼ
Ejective	Lateral fricative				ɬʼ					
Click (top: velar; bottom: uvular)	Tenuis	kʘ qʘ		kǀ qǀ	kǃ qǃ		k𝼊 q𝼊	kǂ qǂ		
Click (top: velar; bottom: uvular)	Voiced	ɡʘ ɢʘ		ɡǀ ɢǀ	ɡǃ ɢǃ		ɡ𝼊 ɢ𝼊	ɡǂ ɢǂ		
Click (top: velar; bottom: uvular)	Nasal	ŋʘ ɴʘ		ŋǀ ɴǀ	ŋǃ ɴǃ		ŋ𝼊 ɴ𝼊	ŋǂ ɴǂ	ʞ	
Click (top: velar; bottom: uvular)	Tenuis lateral				kǁ qǁ					
Click (top: velar; bottom: uvular)	Voiced lateral				ɡǁ ɢǁ					
Click (top: velar; bottom: uvular)	Nasal lateral				ŋǁ ɴǁ					
