= Mid front rounded vowel =

Vowel sound represented by ⟨ø̞⟩ or ⟨œ̝⟩ in IPA

ø̞

œ̝
- IPA number: 310 430

Audio sample
- source · help

Encoding
- Entity (decimal): &#248;&#798;
- Unicode (hex): U+00F8 U+031E
- X-SAMPA: 2_o or 9_r
- Braille: ⠳ (braille pattern dots-1256) ⠠ (braille pattern dots-6) ⠣ (braille pattern dots-126)

IPA: Vowels

	Front	Central	Back
Close	i y	ɨ ʉ	ɯ u
Near-close	ɪ ʏ		ʊ
Close-mid	e ø	ɘ ɵ	ɤ o
Mid	e̞ ø̞	ə	ɤ̞ o̞
Open-mid	ɛ œ	ɜ ɞ	ʌ ɔ
Near-open	æ	ɐ
Open	a ɶ	ä	ɑ ɒ

- IPA help
- audio
- full chart
- template

Legend: unrounded • rounded

The mid front rounded vowel is a type of vowel sound, used in some spoken languages.

Although there is no dedicated symbol in the International Phonetic Alphabet that represents the "exact" mid front rounded vowel between close-mid [ø] and open-mid [œ], ⟨ø⟩ is generally used. If precision is desired, diacritics can be used, such as ⟨ø̞⟩ or ⟨œ̝⟩.

Some of the vowels listed in the table below may phonetically be more back than typical front vowels, as near-front vowels. See mid near-front rounded vowel for other examples.

== Mid front compressed vowel ==
The mid front compressed vowel is typically transcribed in IPA simply as ⟨ø̞⟩ or ⟨œ̝⟩. This article uses the first symbol for simplicity. There is no dedicated diacritic for compression in the IPA. However, the compression of the lips can be shown with the letter ⟨β̞⟩ as ⟨e̞͡β̞⟩ / ⟨ɛ̝͡β̞⟩ (simultaneous [e̞] / [ɛ̝] and labial compression) or ⟨e̞ᵝ⟩ / ⟨ɛ̝ᵝ⟩ ([e̞] / [ɛ̝] modified with labial compression). The spread-lip diacritic ⟨ ͍⟩ may also be used with a rounded vowel letters ⟨ø͍˕⟩ / ⟨œ͍˔⟩ as an ad hoc symbol, though technically 'spread' means unrounded.

=== Features ===
- Its vowel height is mid, which means the tongue is positioned halfway between a close vowel and an open vowel.
- Its vowel backness is front, which means the tongue is positioned forward in the mouth without creating a constriction that would be classified as a consonant. Rounded front vowels are often centralized, which means that often they are in fact near-front.
- Its roundedness is compressed, which means that the margins of the lips are tense and drawn together in such a way that the inner surfaces are not exposed.

=== Occurrence ===
Because front rounded vowels are assumed to have compression, and few descriptions cover the distinction, some of the following may actually have protrusion.

Language		Word	IPA	Meaning	Notes
Breton					Possible realization of unstressed /œ/; can be open-mid [œ] or close-mid [ø] instead.
Catalan	Northern	fulles	[ˈfœ̝jəs]	'leaves'	Realization of /u/ in Capcir. Also found in Occitan and French loanwords and interferences. See Catalan phonology
Danish	Standard	høne	[ˈhœ̝ːnə]	'hen'	Also described as close-mid [øː]; typically transcribed with ⟨œ⟩. See Danish phonology
Dutch	Orsmaal-Gussenhoven dialect	mùl	[mœ̝ɫ]	'well'	Typically transcribed in IPA with ⟨œ⟩.
English	Cockney	bird	[bœ̝ːd]	'bird'	Occasional realization of /ɜː/; can be unrounded [ɛ̝̈ː] or, more often, unrounded central [ɜ̝ː] instead. May be transcribed in IPA with ⟨ɜː⟩ or ⟨œː⟩.
English	General New Zealand	bird	[bœ̝ːd]	'bird'	May be open-mid [œː] instead, or close-mid [øː] in broader varieties. Typically transcribed in IPA with ⟨ɵː⟩. See New Zealand English phonology
English	South African	bird	[bœ̝ːd]	'bird'	Used in General and Broad accents; may be close-mid [øː] instead. In the Cultivated variety, it is realized as mid central unrounded [ɜ̝ː]. See South African English phonology
English	Southern Welsh	bird	[bœ̝ːd]	'bird'	Also described as open-mid [œː] and close-mid [øː].
English	West Midlands	bird	[bœ̝ːd]	'bird'	
Faroese		høgt	[hœ̝kt]	'high'	Typically transcribed in IPA with ⟨œ⟩. See Faroese phonology
Finnish		rölli	[ˈrø̞lːi]	'Common bent'	See Finnish phonology
Greek	Tyrnavos	κοριός / koreos	[ko̞ˈɾø̞s]	'bedbug'	Corresponds to /jo/ and /eo/ in Standard Modern Greek.
Greek	Velvendos	κοριός / koreos	[ko̞ˈɾø̞s]	'bedbug'	Corresponds to /jo/ and /eo/ in Standard Modern Greek.
Hungarian		öl	[ø̞l]	'kill'	See Hungarian phonology
Icelandic		öld	[œ̝l̪t̪]	'age'	Typically transcribed in IPA with ⟨œ⟩. The long allophone is often diphthongized to [øœ]. See Icelandic phonology
Korean		왼손 (oenson)	[ø̞ːnson]	'left hand'	Typically transcribed in IPA with ⟨ø⟩. Diphthongized to [we] in Modern Standard Korean. See Korean phonology
Romanian		bleu	[bl̪ø̞]	'light blue'	Found only in loanwords. See Romanian phonology
Turkish	Standard	göz	[ˈɟœ̝z̟]	'eye'	Typically transcribed in IPA with ⟨œ⟩. May be more centralized as [œ̝̈]. See Turkish phonology

== Mid front protruded vowel ==
Mid front protruded vowel

ø̫˕

œ̫˔

Catford notes that most languages with rounded front and back vowels use distinct types of labialization, protruded back vowels and compressed front vowels. However, a few languages, such as Scandinavian ones, have protruded front vowels. One of these, Swedish, even contrasts the two types of rounding in front vowels (see near-close near-front rounded vowel, with Swedish examples of both types of rounding).

As there are no diacritics in the IPA to distinguish protruded and compressed rounding, ⟨ø̞ʷ⟩ (a mid front rounded vowel modified by endolabialization) will be used here as an ad hoc symbol for protruded mid front vowels.

Acoustically, this sound is "between" the more typical compressed mid front vowel [ø̞] and the unrounded mid front vowel [e̞].

=== Features ===
- Its vowel height is mid, which means the tongue is positioned halfway between a close vowel and an open vowel.
- Its vowel backness is front, which means the tongue is positioned forward in the mouth without creating a constriction that would be classified as a consonant. Rounded front vowels are often centralized, which means that often they are in fact near-front.
- Its roundedness is protruded, which means that the corners of the lips are drawn together, and the inner surfaces exposed.

=== Occurrence ===
Language		Word	IPA	Meaning	Notes
Swedish	Central Standard	rösta	[ˈʐœ̝᫇s˦˥˩tä˦˥˩]	'to vote'	Engstrand (1990) reported the phonemes /œ øː/ and placed the short variant at mid height, as in [œ̝᫇]. According to Pelzer & Boersma (2019), the long vowel has been lowered to open-mid [œ̫ː] in Linköping and Lund, and near-open [œ̞᫇ː] in Stockholm, with the recommendation of transcribing the phoneme as /œː/ instead of /øː/. Persson (2024) reported both short and long variants as allophones of the phonemes /ø øː/, lowered before /r/ and any retroflex segment; long [øː œː] are marked as 'lower-mid' and short [ø œ] are marked as 'mid-high', each pairing being differentiated primarily by formant acoustics other than height, and all as central rather than front. See Swedish phonology

== Notes ==
Place →	Labial					Coronal										Dorsal					Laryngeal			
Manner ↓	Bilabial		Labiodental		Linguolabial		Dental		Alveolar		Postalveolar		Retroflex		(Alveolo-)palatal		Velar		Uvular		Pharyngeal/epiglottal		Glottal	
Nasal	m̥	m	ɱ̊	ɱ		n̼	n̪̊	n̪	n̥	n	n̠̊	n̠	ɳ̊	ɳ	ɲ̊	ɲ	ŋ̊	ŋ	ɴ̥	ɴ				
Plosive	p	b	p̪	b̪	t̼	d̼	t̪	d̪	t	d			ʈ	ɖ	c	ɟ	k	ɡ	q	ɢ	ʡ		ʔ	
Sibilant affricate							t̪s̪	d̪z̪	ts	dz	t̠ʃ	d̠ʒ	tʂ	dʐ	tɕ	dʑ								
Non-sibilant affricate	pɸ	bβ	p̪f	b̪v			t̪θ	d̪ð	tɹ̝̊	dɹ̝	t̠ɹ̠̊˔	d̠ɹ̠˔			cç	ɟʝ	kx	ɡɣ	qχ	ɢʁ	ʡʜ	ʡʢ	ʔh	
Sibilant fricative							s̪	z̪	s	z	ʃ	ʒ	ʂ	ʐ	ɕ	ʑ								
Non-sibilant fricative	ɸ	β	f	v	θ̼	ð̼	θ	ð	θ̠	ð̠	ɹ̠̊˔	ɹ̠˔	ɻ̊˔	ɻ˔	ç	ʝ	x	ɣ	χ	ʁ	ħ	ʕ	h	ɦ
Approximant		β̞		ʋ				ð̞		ɹ		ɹ̠		ɻ		j		ɰ						˷
Tap/flap		ⱱ̟		ⱱ					ɾ̥	ɾ			ɽ̊	ɽ						ɢ̆		ʡ̆		
Trill	ʙ̥	ʙ							r̥	r		r̠	ɽ̊r̥	ɽr					ʀ̥	ʀ	ʜ	ʢ		
Lateral affricate									tɬ	dɮ			tꞎ	d𝼅	c𝼆	ɟʎ̝	k𝼄	ɡʟ̝						
Lateral fricative							ɬ̪		ɬ	ɮ			ꞎ	𝼅	𝼆	ʎ̝	𝼄	ʟ̝						
Lateral approximant								l̪	l̥	l		l̠	ɭ̊	ɭ	ʎ̥	ʎ	ʟ̥	ʟ		ʟ̠				
Lateral tap/flap									ɺ̥	ɺ			𝼈̊	𝼈		ʎ̆		ʟ̆						

		BL	LD	D	A	PA	RF	P	V	U
Implosive	Voiced	ɓ			ɗ		ᶑ	ʄ	ɠ	ʛ
Implosive	Voiceless	ɓ̥			ɗ̥		ᶑ̊	ʄ̊	ɠ̊	ʛ̥
Ejective	Stop	pʼ			tʼ		ʈʼ	cʼ	kʼ	qʼ
Ejective	Affricate		p̪fʼ	t̪θʼ	tsʼ	t̠ʃʼ	tʂʼ	tɕʼ	kxʼ	qχʼ
Ejective	Fricative	ɸʼ	fʼ	θʼ	sʼ	ʃʼ	ʂʼ	ɕʼ	xʼ	χʼ
Ejective	Lateral affricate				tɬʼ			c𝼆ʼ	k𝼄ʼ	q𝼄ʼ
Ejective	Lateral fricative				ɬʼ					
Click (top: velar; bottom: uvular)	Tenuis	kʘ qʘ		kǀ qǀ	kǃ qǃ		k𝼊 q𝼊	kǂ qǂ		
Click (top: velar; bottom: uvular)	Voiced	ɡʘ ɢʘ		ɡǀ ɢǀ	ɡǃ ɢǃ		ɡ𝼊 ɢ𝼊	ɡǂ ɢǂ		
Click (top: velar; bottom: uvular)	Nasal	ŋʘ ɴʘ		ŋǀ ɴǀ	ŋǃ ɴǃ		ŋ𝼊 ɴ𝼊	ŋǂ ɴǂ	ʞ	
Click (top: velar; bottom: uvular)	Tenuis lateral				kǁ qǁ					
Click (top: velar; bottom: uvular)	Voiced lateral				ɡǁ ɢǁ					
Click (top: velar; bottom: uvular)	Nasal lateral				ŋǁ ɴǁ					
