= Close-mid front rounded vowel =

Vowel sound represented by ⟨ø⟩ in IPA

ø
- IPA number: 310

Audio sample
- source · help

Encoding
- Entity (decimal): &#248;
- Unicode (hex): U+00F8
- X-SAMPA: 2
- Braille: ⠳ (braille pattern dots-1256)
Image

IPA: Vowels

| | Front | Central | Back |
|---|---|---|---|
| Close | i y | ɨ ʉ | ɯ u |
| Near-close | ɪ ʏ | | ʊ |
| Close-mid | e ø | ɘ ɵ | ɤ o |
| Mid | e̞ ø̞ | ə | ɤ̞ o̞ |
| Open-mid | ɛ œ | ɜ ɞ | ʌ ɔ |
| Near-open | æ | ɐ |
| Open | a ɶ | ä | ɑ ɒ |

- IPA help
- audio
- full chart
- template

Legend: unrounded • rounded

The close-mid front rounded vowel, or high-mid front rounded vowel, is a type of vowel sound used in some spoken languages.

The symbol in the International Phonetic Alphabet that represents the sound is ⟨ø⟩, a lowercase letter ⟨o⟩ with a diagonal stroke through it, borrowed from Danish, Norwegian, and Faroese, which sometimes use the letter to represent the sound. This sound is represented by the letter ⟨ø⟩ in those languages of Scandinavia; by the digraphs ⟨eu⟩ and ⟨œu⟩ (using the ⟨œ⟩ ligature) in French; and by ⟨ö⟩ in several languages, including the North Germanic languages Swedish and Icelandic, and the Finno-Ugric languages Estonian and Finnish. The symbol is commonly referred to as a "slashed o" in English.

For the close-mid front rounded vowel that is usually transcribed with the symbol ⟨ʏ⟩, see near-close front rounded vowel. If the usual symbol is ⟨ø⟩, the vowel is listed here.

== Close-mid front compressed vowel ==
The close-mid front compressed vowel is typically transcribed in IPA simply as ⟨ø⟩, which is the convention used in this article. There is no dedicated diacritic for compression in the IPA. However, the compression of the lips can be shown with the letter ⟨β̞⟩ as ⟨e͡β̞⟩ (simultaneous [e] and labial compression) or ⟨eᵝ⟩ ([e] modified with labial compression). The spread-lip diacritic ⟨ ͍⟩ may also be used with a rounded vowel letter ⟨ø͍⟩ as an ad hoc symbol, but 'spread' technically means unrounded.

For the close-mid front compressed vowel that is usually transcribed with the symbol ⟨ʏ⟩, see near-close front compressed vowel. If the usual symbol is ⟨ø⟩, the vowel is listed here.

=== Features ===
- Its vowel height is close-mid, also known as high-mid, which means the tongue is positioned halfway between a close vowel (a high vowel) and a mid vowel.
- Its vowel backness is front, which means the tongue is positioned forward in the mouth without creating a constriction that would be classified as a consonant. Rounded front vowels are often centralized, which means that often they are in fact near-front.
- Its roundedness is compressed, which means that the margins of the lips are tense and drawn together in such a way that the inner surfaces are not exposed.

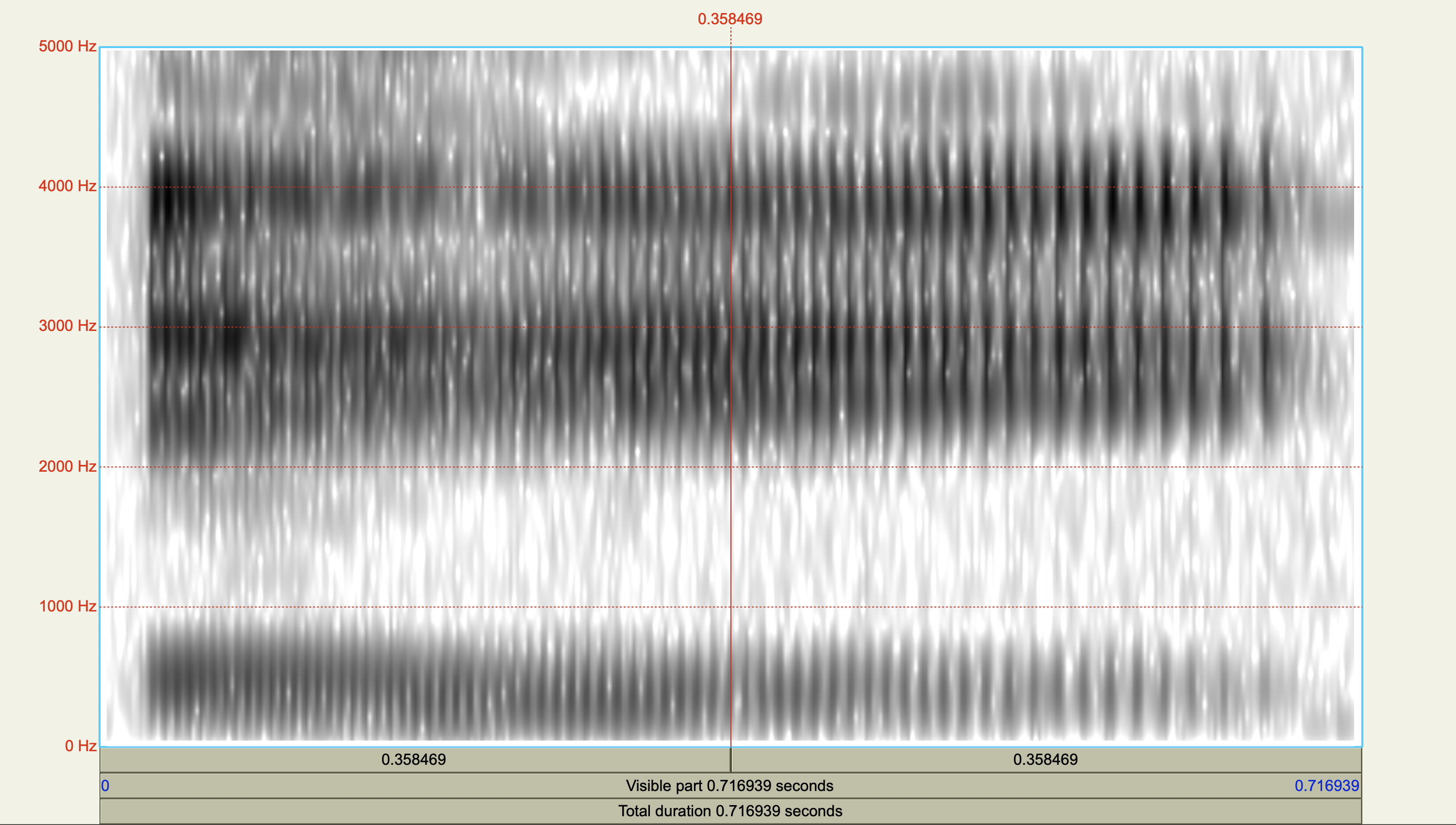
Spectrogram of [ø]

=== Occurrence ===
Because front rounded vowels are assumed to have compression, and few descriptions cover the distinction, some of the following may actually have protrusion.

| Language | | Word | IPA | Meaning | Notes |
|---|---|---|---|---|---|
| Asturian | Some Western dialects | fuöra | [ˈfwøɾɐ] | 'outside' | Realization of ⟨o⟩ in the diphthong ⟨uo⟩. May also be realized as [ɵ] or [œ]. |
| Asturian | Cabrales (East) | ḥuöra | [ˈhwøɾɐ] | 'outside' | Realization of ⟨o⟩ in the diphthong ⟨uo⟩. May also be realized as [ɵ] or [œ]. |
| Bavarian | Amstetten dialect | | | | Contrasts close [y], near-close [ø̝], close-mid [ø] and open-mid [œ] front rounded vowels in addition to the open central unrounded [ä]. Typically transcribed in IPA with ⟨œ⟩. |
| Bavarian | Northern | | | | Allophone of /e/ before /l/. |
| Breton | | eur | [øːʁ] | 'hour' | |
| Chechen | | оьпа / öpa / اوڢا | [øpə] | 'hamster' | |
| Chinese | Shanghainese | 安 / oe | [ø] | 'safety' | |
| Danish | Standard | købe | [ˈkʰøːpə] | 'buy' | Also described as near-close [ø̝ː]. See Danish phonology |
| Djeoromitxi | | [tᶴiˈʔø] | | 'man' | |
| Dutch | Standard Belgian | neus | [nøːs] | 'nose' | Also described as central [ɵː]. In the Standard Northern variety, it is often diphthongized to [øʏ̯]. See Dutch phonology |
| Dutch | Many Eastern and Southern accents | neus | [nøːs] | 'nose' | Present in many Eastern and Southern varieties. See Dutch phonology |
| English | Broad New Zealand | bird | [bøːd] | 'bird' | Possible realization of /ɵː/. Other speakers use a more open vowel [ø̞ː ~ œː]. See New Zealand English phonology |
| English | Cardiff | bird | [bøːd] | 'bird' | Lower [ø̞ː ~ œː] in other southern Welsh accents. It corresponds to mid central unrounded [ɜ̝ː] in other Welsh accents and in RP. |
| English | Port Talbot | bird | [bøːd] | 'bird' | Lower [ø̞ː ~ œː] in other southern Welsh accents. It corresponds to mid central unrounded [ɜ̝ː] in other Welsh accents and in RP. |
| English | Geordie | bird | [bøːd] | 'bird' | Can be mid central unrounded [ɜ̝ː] instead. |
| English | South African | bird | [bøːd] | 'bird' | Used in General and Broad accents; may be mid [ø̞ː] instead. In the Cultivated variety, it is realized as mid central unrounded [ɜ̝ː]. See South African English phonology |
| Estonian | | töö | [tøː] | 'work' | See Estonian phonology |
| Faroese | Suðuroy dialect | bygdin | [ˈpɪktøn] | 'bridges' | Realization of unstressed /i/ and /u/. The stressed vowel typically transcribed with ⟨øː⟩ in IPA transcriptions of Faroese is open-mid [œː]. See Faroese phonology |
| French | | peu | [pø] | 'few' | See French phonology |
| German | Standard | schön | [ʃøːn] | 'beautiful' | See Standard German phonology |
| German | Southern accents | Hölle | [ˈhølə] | 'hell' | Common realization of /œ/ in Southern Germany, Switzerland and Austria. See Standard German phonology |
| Hungarian | | nő | [nøː] | 'woman' | See Hungarian phonology |
| Iaai | | møøk | [møːk] | 'to close eyes' | |
| Kurdish | Palewani (Southern) | سۆر/sör | [søːɾ] | 'wedding' | See Kurdish phonology |
| Lemerig | | lēlqön̄ | [lɪlk͡pʷøŋ] | 'forget' | |
| Limburgish | Most dialects | beuk | [ˈbø̌ːk] | 'beech' | Central [ɵː] in Maastricht; the example word is from the Hamont-Achel dialect. |
| Lombard | Lombardy | nöf / noeuv | [nøːf] | 'new' | One of the phonetic pronunciations of the classic lombard orthography trigraph 'oeu', along with [ø], modern orthography uses 'ö' to distinguish it from the [œ] phoneme that is rendered by letter 'œ'. |
| Low German | | sön / zeun | [zøːn] | 'son' | May be realized as a narrow closing diphthong in certain dialects. |
| Löyöp | | nö‑qöy | [nø k͡pʷøj] | 'place haunted by spirits' | |
| Luxembourgish | | blöd | [bløːt] | 'stupid' | Occurs only in loanwords. See Luxembourgish phonology |
| Portuguese | Micaelense | boi | [bø] | 'ox' | Allophone of /o/. See Portuguese phonology |
| Portuguese | Some European speakers | dou | [d̪øw] | 'I give' | Allophone of /o/. See Portuguese phonology |
| Ripuarian | Cologne | Mösch | [møɕ] | 'sparrow' | Can also appear long, as in pröve [pʁøː¹və] 'test'. |
| Saterland Frisian | | Göäte | [ˈɡøːtə] | 'gutter' | Typically transcribed in IPA with ⟨œː⟩. Phonetically, it is nearly identical to /ʏ/ ([ʏ̞]). The vowel typically transcribed in IPA with ⟨øː⟩ is actually near-close [ø̝ː]. |
| Wariʼ | | camö | [kaˈmø] | 'capybara' | Rare; for some speakers, it is evolving into [e] in open syllables and [y] in closed ones. |
| West Frisian | Hindeloopers | beuch | [bøːx] | | Diphthongized to [øy̑] in Standard West Frisian. See West Frisian phonology |

== Close-mid front protruded vowel ==
Close-mid front protruded vowel

ø̫

Catford notes that most languages with rounded front and back vowels use distinct types of labialization, protruded back vowels and compressed front vowels. However, a few, such as the Scandinavian languages, have protruded front vowels. One of them, Swedish, even contrasts the two types of rounding in front vowels (see near-close near-front rounded vowel, with Swedish examples of both types of rounding).

As there are no diacritics in the IPA to distinguish protruded and compressed rounding, an old diacritic for labialization, ⟨ ̫⟩, will be used here as an ad hoc symbol for protruded front vowels. Another possible transcription is ⟨øʷ⟩ or ⟨eʷ⟩ (a close-mid front vowel modified by endolabialization), but that could be misread as a diphthong.

For the close-mid front protruded vowel that is usually transcribed with the symbol ⟨ʏ⟩, see near-close front protruded vowel. If the usual symbol is ⟨ø⟩, the vowel is listed here.

Acoustically, the sound is in between the more typical compressed close-mid front vowel [ø] and the unrounded close-mid front vowel [e].

=== Features ===
- Its vowel height is close-mid, also known as high-mid, which means the tongue is positioned halfway between a close vowel (a high vowel) and a mid vowel.
- Its vowel backness is front, which means the tongue is positioned forward in the mouth without creating a constriction that would be classified as a consonant. Rounded front vowels are often centralized, which means that often they are in fact near-front.
- Its roundedness is protruded, which means that the corners of the lips are drawn together, and the inner surfaces exposed.

=== Occurrence ===
| Language | | Word | IPA | Meaning | Notes |
|---|---|---|---|---|---|
| Norwegian | | søt | [sø̫ːt] | 'sweet' | The example word is from Urban East Norwegian, in which the vowel has also been described as central [ɵː]. See Norwegian phonology |
| Swedish | Central Standard | dö | [dø̫ː] | 'to die' | Eklund & Traunmüller (1997) reported this vowel to diphthongise (as in [nø̫̈œ̫̈d]) but recent accounts of Linköping and Stockholm accents failed to replicate the results. Engstrand (1990) reported the phonemes /œ øː/ and placed the short variant at mid height, as in [œ̝᫇]. According to Pelzer & Boersma (2019), the long vowel has been lowered to open-mid [œ̫ː] in Linköping and Lund, and near-open [œ̞᫇ː] in Stockholm, with the recommendation of transcribing the phoneme as /œː/ instead of /øː/. Persson (2024) reported both short and long variants as allophones of the phonemes /ø øː/, lowered before /r/ and any retroflex segment; long [øː œː] are marked as 'lower-mid' and short [ø œ] are marked as 'mid-high', each pairing being differentiated primarily by formant acoustics other than height, and all as central rather than front. See Swedish phonology |

== See also ==
- Index of phonetics articles

== Notes ==
| Place → | Labial | | | | | Coronal | | | | | | | | | | Dorsal | | | | | Laryngeal | | | |
| Manner ↓ | Bilabial | | Labiodental | | Linguolabial | | Dental | | Alveolar | | Postalveolar | | Retroflex | | (Alveolo-)palatal | | Velar | | Uvular | | Pharyngeal/epiglottal | | Glottal | |
|---|---|---|---|---|---|---|---|---|---|---|---|---|---|---|---|---|---|---|---|---|---|---|---|---|
| Nasal | m̥ | m | ɱ̊ | ɱ | | n̼ | n̪̊ | n̪ | n̥ | n | n̠̊ | n̠ | ɳ̊ | ɳ | ɲ̊ | ɲ | ŋ̊ | ŋ | ɴ̥ | ɴ | | | | |
| Plosive | p | b | p̪ | b̪ | t̼ | d̼ | t̪ | d̪ | t | d | | | ʈ | ɖ | c | ɟ | k | ɡ | q | ɢ | ʡ | | ʔ | |
| Sibilant affricate | | | | | | | t̪s̪ | d̪z̪ | ts | dz | t̠ʃ | d̠ʒ | tʂ | dʐ | tɕ | dʑ | | | | | | | | |
| Non-sibilant affricate | pɸ | bβ | p̪f | b̪v | | | t̪θ | d̪ð | tɹ̝̊ | dɹ̝ | t̠ɹ̠̊˔ | d̠ɹ̠˔ | | | cç | ɟʝ | kx | ɡɣ | qχ | ɢʁ | ʡʜ | ʡʢ | ʔh | |
| Sibilant fricative | | | | | | | s̪ | z̪ | s | z | ʃ | ʒ | ʂ | ʐ | ɕ | ʑ | | | | | | | | |
| Non-sibilant fricative | ɸ | β | f | v | θ̼ | ð̼ | θ | ð | θ̠ | ð̠ | ɹ̠̊˔ | ɹ̠˔ | ɻ̊˔ | ɻ˔ | ç | ʝ | x | ɣ | χ | ʁ | ħ | ʕ | h | ɦ |
| Approximant | | β̞ | | ʋ | | | | ð̞ | | ɹ | | ɹ̠ | | ɻ | | j | | ɰ | | | | | | ˷ |
| Tap/flap | | ⱱ̟ | | ⱱ | | | | | ɾ̥ | ɾ | | | ɽ̊ | ɽ | | | | | | ɢ̆ | | ʡ̆ | | |
| Trill | ʙ̥ | ʙ | | | | | | | r̥ | r | | r̠ | ɽ̊r̥ | ɽr | | | | | ʀ̥ | ʀ | ʜ | ʢ | | |
| Lateral affricate | | | | | | | | | tɬ | dɮ | | | tꞎ | d𝼅 | c𝼆 | ɟʎ̝ | k𝼄 | ɡʟ̝ | | | | | | |
| Lateral fricative | | | | | | | ɬ̪ | | ɬ | ɮ | | | ꞎ | 𝼅 | 𝼆 | ʎ̝ | 𝼄 | ʟ̝ | | | | | | |
| Lateral approximant | | | | | | | | l̪ | l̥ | l | | l̠ | ɭ̊ | ɭ | ʎ̥ | ʎ | ʟ̥ | ʟ | | ʟ̠ | | | | |
| Lateral tap/flap | | | | | | | | | ɺ̥ | ɺ | | | 𝼈̊ | 𝼈 | | ʎ̆ | | ʟ̆ | | | | | | |

| | | BL | LD | D | A | PA | RF | P | V | U |
|---|---|---|---|---|---|---|---|---|---|---|
| Implosive | Voiced | ɓ | | | ɗ | | ᶑ | ʄ | ɠ | ʛ |
| Implosive | Voiceless | ɓ̥ | | | ɗ̥ | | ᶑ̊ | ʄ̊ | ɠ̊ | ʛ̥ |
| Ejective | Stop | pʼ | | | tʼ | | ʈʼ | cʼ | kʼ | qʼ |
| Ejective | Affricate | | p̪fʼ | t̪θʼ | tsʼ | t̠ʃʼ | tʂʼ | tɕʼ | kxʼ | qχʼ |
| Ejective | Fricative | ɸʼ | fʼ | θʼ | sʼ | ʃʼ | ʂʼ | ɕʼ | xʼ | χʼ |
| Ejective | Lateral affricate | | | | tɬʼ | | | c𝼆ʼ | k𝼄ʼ | q𝼄ʼ |
| Ejective | Lateral fricative | | | | ɬʼ | | | | | |
| Click (top: velar; bottom: uvular) | Tenuis | kʘ qʘ | | kǀ qǀ | kǃ qǃ | | k𝼊 q𝼊 | kǂ qǂ | | |
| Click (top: velar; bottom: uvular) | Voiced | ɡʘ ɢʘ | | ɡǀ ɢǀ | ɡǃ ɢǃ | | ɡ𝼊 ɢ𝼊 | ɡǂ ɢǂ | | |
| Click (top: velar; bottom: uvular) | Nasal | ŋʘ ɴʘ | | ŋǀ ɴǀ | ŋǃ ɴǃ | | ŋ𝼊 ɴ𝼊 | ŋǂ ɴǂ | ʞ | |
| Click (top: velar; bottom: uvular) | Tenuis lateral | | | | kǁ qǁ | | | | | |
| Click (top: velar; bottom: uvular) | Voiced lateral | | | | ɡǁ ɢǁ | | | | | |
| Click (top: velar; bottom: uvular) | Nasal lateral | | | | ŋǁ ɴǁ | | | | | |
