= Voiceless alveolar affricate =

Class of consonantal sounds

Voiceless alveolar sibilant affricate

ts

ʦ
- IPA number: 103 132

Audio sample
- source · help

Encoding
- Entity (decimal): &#678;
- Unicode (hex): U+02A6
- X-SAMPA: ts
Image

A voiceless alveolar affricate is a type of affricate consonant pronounced with the tip or blade of the tongue against the alveolar ridge (gum line) just behind the teeth. There are several types of median affricates with significant perceptual differences:

- A voiceless alveolar sibilant affricate [t͡s] is the most common type, similar to the ts in English cats.
- A voiceless alveolar non-sibilant affricate [tɹ̝̊]. It is found as a regional realization of the sequence /tr/ in some Sicilian dialects of Standard Italian.
- A voiceless retracted alveolar sibilant affricate [t͡s̺], also called apico-alveolar or grave, has a weak hushing sound reminiscent of retroflex affricates. One language in which it is found is Basque, where it contrasts with a more conventional non-retracted laminal alveolar affricate.

This article discusses the first two.

== Voiceless alveolar sibilant affricate ==
A voiceless alveolar sibilant affricate is a type of consonantal sound, used in some spoken languages. The sound is transcribed in the International Phonetic Alphabet with ⟨t͡s⟩ or ⟨t͜s⟩. The tie bar may be omitted, yielding ⟨ts⟩. There is also a ligature ⟨ʦ⟩, which has been retired by the International Phonetic Association but is still used. A voiceless alveolar affricate occurs in many Indo-European languages, such as German (which was also part of the High German consonant shift), Kashmiri, Marathi, Pashto, Russian and most other Slavic languages such as Polish and Serbo-Croatian; also, among many others, in Georgian, in Mongolia, and Tibetan Sanskrit, in Japanese, in Mandarin Chinese, and in Cantonese. Some international auxiliary languages, such as Esperanto, Ido and Interlingua also include this sound.

=== Features ===
Features of a voiceless alveolar sibilant affricate:

- Its manner of articulation is sibilant affricate, which means it is produced by first stopping the air flow entirely, then directing it with the tongue to the sharp edge of the teeth, causing high-frequency turbulence.
- The stop component of this affricate is laminal alveolar, which means it is articulated with the blade of the tongue at the alveolar ridge. For simplicity, this affricate is usually described by the sibilant fricative component.
- There are at least three specific variants of the fricative component:
  - Dentalized laminal alveolar (commonly called "dental"), which means it is articulated with the tongue blade very close to the upper front teeth, with the tongue tip resting behind lower front teeth. The hissing effect in this variety of [s] is very strong.
  - Non-retracted alveolar, which means it is articulated with either the tip or the blade of the tongue at the alveolar ridge, termed respectively apical and laminal.
  - Retracted alveolar, which means it is articulated with either the tip or the blade of the tongue slightly behind the alveolar ridge, termed respectively apical and laminal. Acoustically, it is close to [ʃ] or laminal [ʂ].
- Its phonation is voiceless, which means it is produced without vibrations of the vocal cords. In some languages the vocal cords are actively separated, so it is always voiceless; in others the cords are lax, so that it may take on the voicing of adjacent sounds.
- It is an oral consonant, which means that air is not allowed to escape through the nose.
- It is a median consonant, which means it is produced by directing the airstream down the midline of the tongue, rather than to the sides.
- Its airstream mechanism is pulmonic, which means it is articulated by pushing air only with the intercostal muscles and abdominal muscles, as in most speech sounds.

=== Occurrence ===
The following sections are named after the fricative component.

==== Dentalized laminal alveolar ====
Voiceless dental sibilant affricate

t̪s̪

t̻s̪

Audio sample
- source · help

Language		Word	IPA	Meaning	Notes
Armenian	Eastern	ցանց/canc	[t̻͡s̪ʰan̪t̻͡s̪ʰ]	'net'	Contrasts aspirated and unaspirated forms
Basque		hotz	[o̞t̻͡s̪]	'cold'	Contrasts with a sibilant affricate with an apical fricative component.
Belarusian		цётка/ciotka	[ˈt̻͡s̪ʲɵtka]	'aunt'	Contrasting palatalization. See Belarusian phonology
Bulgarian		цар/car	[t̻͡s̪är]	'Tsar'	See Bulgarian phonology
Chinese	Mandarin	早餐 / zǎo cān	[t̻͡s̪ɑʊ˨˩ t̻͡s̪ʰan˥]	'breakfast'	Contrasts with aspirated form. See Standard Chinese phonology
Chinese	Cantonese	早餐 / zou2 caan1	/t͡sou˧˥ t͡sʰaːn˥/	'breakfast'	See Cantonese phonology
Hungarian		cica	[ˈt̻͡s̪it̻͡s̪ɒ]	'kitten'	See Hungarian phonology
Japanese		津波 / tsunami	[t̻͡s̪ɯ̟ᵝnämʲi]	'Tsunami'	Allophone of /t/ before /u/. See Japanese phonology
Japanese		モッツァレラ/mottsarera	[mo̞t̻t̻͡s̪äɾe̞ɾä]	'mozzarella'	May appear before other vowels in loanwords. See Japanese phonology
Kashmiri		ژاس / Tsás	[t͡saːs]	'cough'	Contrasts with aspirated form.
Kashmiri		ژھَل / Tshal	[t͡sʰal]	'trap'	Aspirated equivalent.
Kashubian					
Kazakh		инвестиция/investitsiya	[investit̻͡s̪əja]	'price'	Only in loanwords from Russian See Kazakh phonology and Kyrgyz phonology
Kyrgyz		инвестиция/investitsiya	[investit̻͡s̪əja]	'price'	Only in loanwords from Russian See Kazakh phonology and Kyrgyz phonology
Latvian		cena	[ˈt̻͡s̪en̪ä]	'price'	See Latvian phonology
Macedonian		цвет/cvet	[t̻͡s̪ve̞t̪]	'flower'	See Macedonian phonology
Pashto		څلور/śalor	[t͡saˈlor]	'four'	See Pashto phonology
Romanian		preț	[pre̞t̻͡s̪]	'price'	See Romanian phonology
Russian		царь/caŕ	[t̻͡s̪ärʲ]	'Tsar'	See Russian phonology
Serbo-Croatian		циљ / cilj / ڄیڵ	[t̻͡s̪îːʎ]	'target'	See Serbo-Croatian phonology
Slovene		cvet	[t̻͡s̪ʋêːt̪]	'bloom'	See Slovene phonology
Spanish	Andalusian	resto	[ˈre̞(h)t̻͡s̪(ʰ)o̞]	'rest'	See Andalusian Spanish
Tyap		tsa	[t͡sa]	'to begin'	
Ukrainian		цей/cej	[t̻͡s̪ɛj]	'this one'	Contrasting palatalization. See Ukrainian phonology
Upper Sorbian		cybla	[ˈt̻͡s̪ɘblä]	'onion'	
Uzbek					

==== Alveolar ====
Language		Word	IPA	Meaning	Notes
Arabic	Najdi	ك‍لب / tsalb	[t͡salb]	'dog'	Corresponds to /k/ and /t͡ʃ/ in other dialects
Asturian	Some dialects	otso	[ˈot͡so]	'eight'	Corresponds to standard /t͡ʃ/
Asturian	Ḷḷena, Mieres, and others	ḷḷuna	[ˈt͡sunɐ]	'moon'	Alveolar realization of che vaqueira instead of normal retroflex [ʈ͡ʂ]
Blackfoot		ᖹᒧᐧᒣᑯ / Niitsítapii	[niːt͡sɪ́tʌpiː]	'original person' or 'Blackfoot person'	
Central Alaskan Yup'ik		cetaman	[t͡səˈtaman]	'four'	Allophone of /t͡ʃ/ before schwa
Chamorro		CHamoru	[t͡sɑˈmoːɾu]	'Chamorro'	Spelled Chamoru in the orthography used in the Northern Mariana Islands.
Chechen		цаца / caca / ر̤ار̤ا	[t͡sət͡sə]	'sieve'	
Cherokee		ᏣᎳᎩ tsalagi	[t͡salaɡi]	'Cherokee'	
Czech		co	[t͡sɔ]	'what'	See Czech phonology
Danish	Standard	to	[ˈt̻͡s̺ʰoːˀ]	'two'	The fricative component is apical. In some accents, it is realized as [tʰ]. Usually transcribed /tˢ/ or /t/. Contrasts with the unaspirated stop [t], which is usually transcribed /d̥/ or /d/. See Danish phonology
Dargwa		цадеш / ꞩadeş / ڝادەش	[t͡sadeʃ]	'unity, oneness'	
Dutch	Orsmaal-Gussenhoven dialect	mat	[ˈmät͡s]	'market'	Optional pre-pausal allophone of /t/. See Orsmaal-Gussenhoven dialect phonology
English	Broad Cockney	tea	[ˈt͡səˑi̯]	'tea'	Possible word-initial, intervocalic and word-final allophone of /t/. See English phonology
English	Received Pronunciation	tea	[ˈt͡sɪˑi̯]	'tea'	Possible word-initial, intervocalic and word-final allophone of /t/. See English phonology
English	New York	tea	[ˈt͡sɪˑi̯]	'tea'	Possible syllable-initial and sometimes also utterance-final allophone of /t/. See English phonology
English	New Zealand	tea	[ˈt͡sɪˑi̯]	'tea'	Word-initial allophone of /t/. See English phonology
English	North Wales	tea	[ˈt͡siː]	'tea'	Word-initial and word-final allophone of /t/; in free variation with a strongly aspirated stop [tʰ]. See English phonology
English	Port Talbot	tea	[ˈt͡siː]	'tea'	Allophone of /t/. In free variation with [tʰʰ].
English	Scouse	tea	[ˈt͡siː]	'tea'	Possible syllable-initial and word-final allophone of /t/. See English phonology
English	General South African	wanting	[ˈwɑnt͡sɪŋ]	'wanting'	Possible syllable-final allophone of /t/.
Esperanto		cico	['t͡sit͡so]	'nipple'	See Esperanto phonology
Filipino		tsokolate	[t͡sokɔlate]	'chocolate'	
French	Quebec	tu	[t͡sy]	'you'	Allophone of /t/ before /i, y/.
Georgian		კაცი/k'atsi	[kʼɑt͡si]	'man'	
Haida		x̱ants	[ʜʌnt͡s]	'shadow'	Allophone of /t͡ʃ/.
Hebrew		צֵל/tzel	[t͡se̞l]	'shadow'	
Hmong Daw		txaug	/t͡sau̯˧˩̤/	'chisel'	Contrast aspirated and non-aspirated versions.
Korean	North Korean	조선 / Chosŏn	[t͡sɔsɔn]	'North Korea'	Corresponds to /t͡ɕ/ in South Korean. See Korean phonology
Luxembourgish		Zuch	[t͡suχ]	'train'	See Luxembourgish phonology
Marathi		चमचा/tsamtsā	['t͡səmt͡saː]	'spoon'	Represented by ⟨च⟩, which also represents [t͡ʃ]. It is not a marked difference.
Nepali		चाप/tsāp	[t͡säp]	'pressure'	Contrasts aspirated and unaspirated versions. The unaspirated is represented by ⟨च⟩. The aspirated sound is represented by ⟨छ⟩. See Nepali phonology
Nuxalk		tskw	[t͡sk͡xʷ]	'heavy'	Contrasts with /t͡sʼ/ and /ts/ [tʰs].
Polish		co	[t͡sɔ]	'what'	See Polish phonology
Portuguese	European	parte sem vida	[ˈpaɾt͡sẽj ˈviðɐ]	'lifeless part'	Allophone of /t/ before /i, ĩ/, or assimilation due to the deletion of /i ~ ɨ ~ e/. Increasingly used in Brazil.
Portuguese	Brazilian	participação	[paʁt͡sipaˈsɐ̃w̃]	'participation'	Allophone of /t/ before /i, ĩ/, or assimilation due to the deletion of /i ~ ɨ ~ e/. Increasingly used in Brazil.
Portuguese	Most speakers	shiatsu	[ɕiˈat͡su]	'shiatsu'	Marginal sound. Many Brazilians might break the affricate with epenthetic [i], often subsequently palatalizing /t/, specially in pre-tonic contexts (e.g. tsunami [tɕisuˈnɜ̃mʲi]). See Portuguese phonology
Slovak		cisár	[t͡sɪsaːr]	'emperor'	See Slovak phonology
Spanish	Madrid	ancha	[ˈänʲt͡sʲä]	'wide'	Palatalized; with an apical fricative component. It corresponds to [t͡ʃ] in standard Spanish. See Spanish phonology
Spanish	Chilean	ancha	[ˈänʲt͡sʲä]	'wide'	Palatalized; with an apical fricative component. It corresponds to [t͡ʃ] in standard Spanish. See Spanish phonology
Spanish	Some Rioplatense dialects	tía	[ˈt͡siä]	'aunt'	Palatalized; with an apical fricative component. It corresponds to [t͡ʃ] in standard Spanish. See Spanish phonology
Spanish	Some Venezuelan dialects	zorro	[ˈt͡so̞ro̞]	'fox'	Allophone of /s/ word initially.
Tamil	Jaffna Tamil	சந்தை/cantai	[t͡sɐn̪d̪ɛi̯]	'market'	Rare, other realizations include [t͡ʃ, ʃ, s].
Telugu		ౘట్టి/ĉaṭṭi	[t͡sɐʈʈi]	'pot'	

==== Retracted alveolar ====
Voiceless retracted alveolar sibilant affricate

t̻͡s̺

Language		Word	IPA	Meaning	Notes
Basque		hots	[ot̻͡s̺]	'sound'	The fricative component is apical. Contrasts with a laminal affricate with a dentalized fricative component.
Catalan	Many dialects	tots	[ˈt̪ot̻͡s̺]	'all, everyone'	The fricative component is apical. Only restricted to morpheme boundaries, some linguistics do not consider it a phoneme (but a sequence of [t] + [s]). Long and short versions of intervocalic affricates are in free variation in Central Catalan [t͡ːs] ~ [t͡s]. In some dialects it merges with [t͡ɕ] in the coda. See Catalan phonology
Catalan	Central Valencian	dotze	[ˈd̪ot̻͡s̺e]	'twelve'	Devoiced allophone of /d͡z/ in parts of Central Valencian and Eastern Aragon. See Catalan phonology

==== Variable ====
Language		Word	IPA	Meaning	Notes
German	Standard	Zeit	[t͡säɪ̯t]	'time'	The fricative component varies between dentalized laminal, non-retracted laminal and non-retracted apical. See Standard German phonology
Italian	Standard	grazia	[ˈɡrät̚t͡sjä]	'grace'	The fricative component varies between dentalized laminal and non-retracted apical. In the latter case, the stop component is laminal denti-alveolar. See Italian phonology

== Voiceless alveolar non-sibilant affricate ==
Voiceless alveolar non-sibilant affricate

tɹ̝̊

=== Features ===
- Its manner of articulation is affricate, which means it is produced by first stopping the airflow entirely, then allowing air flow through a constricted channel at the place of articulation, causing turbulence.
- Its place of articulation is alveolar, which means it is articulated with either the tip or the blade of the tongue at the alveolar ridge, termed respectively apical and laminal.
- Its phonation is voiceless, which means it is produced without vibrations of the vocal cords. In some languages the vocal cords are actively separated, so it is always voiceless; in others the cords are lax, so that it may take on the voicing of adjacent sounds.
- It is an oral consonant, which means that air is not allowed to escape through the nose.
- It is a median consonant, which means it is produced by directing the airstream down the midline of the tongue, rather than to the sides.
- Its airstream mechanism is pulmonic, which means it is articulated by pushing air only with the intercostal muscles and abdominal muscles, as in most speech sounds.

=== Occurrence ===
Language		Word	IPA	Meaning	Notes
Dutch	Orsmaal-Gussenhoven dialect	verbèganger	[vərˈbɛːɣäŋət͡ɹ̝̊]	'passer-by'	A possible realization of word-final /r/ before pauses.
English	General American	tree	[t͡ɹ̝̊ʷɪi̯]	'tree'	Phonetic realization of the stressed, syllable-initial sequence /tr/; more commonly postalveolar [t̠ɹ̠̊˔]. See English phonology
English	Received Pronunciation	tree	[t͡ɹ̝̊ʷɪi̯]	'tree'	Phonetic realization of the stressed, syllable-initial sequence /tr/; more commonly postalveolar [t̠ɹ̠̊˔]. See English phonology
Italian	Sicily	straniero	[st͡ɹ̝̊äˈnjɛɾo]	'foreign'	Apical. Regional realization of the sequence /tr/; may be a sequence [t ɹ̝̊] or [t ɹ̝] instead (spaces added for distinction). See Italian phonology

== See also ==
- Index of phonetics articles

== Notes ==
Place →	Labial					Coronal										Dorsal					Laryngeal			
Manner ↓	Bilabial		Labiodental		Linguolabial		Dental		Alveolar		Postalveolar		Retroflex		(Alveolo-)palatal		Velar		Uvular		Pharyngeal/epiglottal		Glottal	
Nasal	m̥	m	ɱ̊	ɱ		n̼	n̪̊	n̪	n̥	n	n̠̊	n̠	ɳ̊	ɳ	ɲ̊	ɲ	ŋ̊	ŋ	ɴ̥	ɴ				
Plosive	p	b	p̪	b̪	t̼	d̼	t̪	d̪	t	d			ʈ	ɖ	c	ɟ	k	ɡ	q	ɢ	ʡ		ʔ	
Sibilant affricate							t̪s̪	d̪z̪	ts	dz	t̠ʃ	d̠ʒ	tʂ	dʐ	tɕ	dʑ								
Non-sibilant affricate	pɸ	bβ	p̪f	b̪v			t̪θ	d̪ð	tɹ̝̊	dɹ̝	t̠ɹ̠̊˔	d̠ɹ̠˔			cç	ɟʝ	kx	ɡɣ	qχ	ɢʁ	ʡʜ	ʡʢ	ʔh	
Sibilant fricative							s̪	z̪	s	z	ʃ	ʒ	ʂ	ʐ	ɕ	ʑ								
Non-sibilant fricative	ɸ	β	f	v	θ̼	ð̼	θ	ð	θ̠	ð̠	ɹ̠̊˔	ɹ̠˔	ɻ̊˔	ɻ˔	ç	ʝ	x	ɣ	χ	ʁ	ħ	ʕ	h	ɦ
Approximant		β̞		ʋ				ð̞		ɹ		ɹ̠		ɻ		j		ɰ						˷
Tap/flap		ⱱ̟		ⱱ					ɾ̥	ɾ			ɽ̊	ɽ						ɢ̆		ʡ̆		
Trill	ʙ̥	ʙ							r̥	r		r̠	ɽ̊r̥	ɽr					ʀ̥	ʀ	ʜ	ʢ		
Lateral affricate									tɬ	dɮ			tꞎ	d𝼅	c𝼆	ɟʎ̝	k𝼄	ɡʟ̝						
Lateral fricative							ɬ̪		ɬ	ɮ			ꞎ	𝼅	𝼆	ʎ̝	𝼄	ʟ̝						
Lateral approximant								l̪	l̥	l		l̠	ɭ̊	ɭ	ʎ̥	ʎ	ʟ̥	ʟ		ʟ̠				
Lateral tap/flap									ɺ̥	ɺ			𝼈̊	𝼈		ʎ̆		ʟ̆						

		BL	LD	D	A	PA	RF	P	V	U
Implosive	Voiced	ɓ			ɗ		ᶑ	ʄ	ɠ	ʛ
Implosive	Voiceless	ɓ̥			ɗ̥		ᶑ̊	ʄ̊	ɠ̊	ʛ̥
Ejective	Stop	pʼ			tʼ		ʈʼ	cʼ	kʼ	qʼ
Ejective	Affricate		p̪fʼ	tθʼ	tsʼ	tʃʼ	tʂʼ	tɕʼ	kxʼ	qχʼ
Ejective	Fricative	ɸʼ	fʼ	θʼ	sʼ	ʃʼ	ʂʼ	ɕʼ	xʼ	χʼ
Ejective	Lateral affricate				tɬʼ			c𝼆ʼ	k𝼄ʼ	q𝼄ʼ
Ejective	Lateral fricative				ɬʼ					
Click (top: velar; bottom: uvular)	Tenuis	kʘ qʘ		kǀ qǀ	kǃ qǃ		k𝼊 q𝼊	kǂ qǂ		
Click (top: velar; bottom: uvular)	Voiced	ɡʘ ɢʘ		ɡǀ ɢǀ	ɡǃ ɢǃ		ɡ𝼊 ɢ𝼊	ɡǂ ɢǂ		
Click (top: velar; bottom: uvular)	Nasal	ŋʘ ɴʘ		ŋǀ ɴǀ	ŋǃ ɴǃ		ŋ𝼊 ɴ𝼊	ŋǂ ɴǂ	ʞ	
Click (top: velar; bottom: uvular)	Tenuis lateral				kǁ qǁ					
Click (top: velar; bottom: uvular)	Voiced lateral				ɡǁ ɢǁ					
Click (top: velar; bottom: uvular)	Nasal lateral				ŋǁ ɴǁ					
