= Estuary English =

Dialect of English

- Native to: England
- Region: Greater London and Home Counties
- Language family: Indo-European: Germanic; West Germanic; Ingvaeonic; Anglic; English; British English; Estuary English
- Early forms: Old English: Middle English; Early Modern English
- Writing system: Latin (English alphabet)

Language codes
- ISO 639-3: –
- Glottolog: None

Speech example
An example of a male speaker from Essex (Russell Brand)

Speech example
An example of a female speaker from Kent (Tracey Emin)

Speech example
An example of a male speaker from Berkshire (Ricky Gervais)

Estuary English is an English accent, a continuum of accents, or a continuum of accent features associated with the area along the River Thames and its estuary, including parts of London, since the late 20th century. In 2000, the phonetician John C. Wells proposed a definition of Estuary English as "Standard English spoken with the accent of the southeast of England". He views Estuary English as an emerging standard accent of England, while also acknowledging that it is a social construct rather than a technically well-defined linguistic phenomenon. He describes it as "intermediate" between the 20th-century higher-class non-regional standard accent Received Pronunciation (RP), and the 20th-century lower-class local London accent Cockney. There is much debate among linguists as to where Cockney and RP end and where Estuary English begins, or whether Estuary English is even a single cohesive accent.

== Name ==
Cruttenden uses the term London Regional General British in preference to the popular term "Estuary English".

The names listed above may be abbreviated:

- Estuary English → EE
- London Regional General British → London RGB

Wells has used different names for an accent closer to Cockney (Popular London) or closer to Received Pronunciation (London Regional Standard or South-Eastern Regional Standard). Cruttenden uses the name Popular London to refer to Cockney pronunciation itself.

== Status as accent of English ==
The boundaries between RP (Received Pronunciation), Estuary English and Cockney are far from clear-cut. Wells cites David Rosewarne (who originated the term in 1984) as locating EE in the middle of "a continuum that has RP and London speech at either end". Several writers have argued that Estuary English is not a discrete accent distinct from the accents of the London area. The sociolinguist Peter Trudgill has written that the term "Estuary English" is inappropriate because "it suggests that we are talking about a new variety, which we are not; and because it suggests that it is a variety of English confined to the banks of the Thames estuary, which it is not. The label actually refers to the lower middle class accents, as opposed to working class accents, of the Home Counties Modern Dialect area". Roach comments, "In reality there is no such accent and the term should be used with care. The idea originates from the sociolinguistic observation that some people in public life who would previously have been expected to speak with an RP accent now find it acceptable to speak with some characteristics of the London area ... such as glottal stops, which would in earlier times have caused comment or disapproval".

Foulkes & Docherty (1999) state "All of its [EE's] features can be located on a sociolinguistic and geographical continuum between RP and Cockney, and are spreading not because Estuary English is a coherent and identifiable influence, but because the features represent neither the standard nor the extreme non-standard poles of the continuum". In order to tackle these problems put forward by expert linguists, Altendorf (2016) argues that Estuary English should be viewed as a folk category rather than an expert linguistic category. As such it takes the form of a perceptual prototype category that does not require discrete boundaries in order to function in the eyes (and ears) of lay observers of language variation and change.

Collins et al. state that "In the 1990s and the first few years of the 2000s, this putative new variety was fiercely debated both in the media and academia, but since then interest in Estuary English has waned and been replaced by discussion of the capital's latest linguistic innovation – Multicultural London English".

== Features ==
Published accounts of EE describe it mainly in terms of differences from Received Pronunciation and from Cockney. Wells (1994) states that "Estuary English (EE) is like RP, but unlike Cockney, in being associated with standard grammar and usage". Differences are found at phonemic and allophonic levels.

=== Features distinguishing EE from RP ===
Wells identifies a small number of key features that may distinguish EE from RP; these features may be summarized as follows:

- /l/-vocalization
- /t/-glottalization
- Diphthong shift
- Yod-coalescence

Other distinguishing features have been suggested by other studies:

- Th-fronting
- Other vowel differences

==== /l/-vocalization ====
It has been widely observed that EE exhibits vocalization of preconsonantal/final /l/, perhaps with various vowel mergers before it (an informal example being "miwk bottoo" for "milk bottle"). Wells cites the specific case of allophony in GOAT (> [ɒʊ] before dark /l/ or its reflex), leading perhaps to a phonemic split ("wholly" vs. "holy"). This topic is usually referred to as L-vocalization. There is said to be alternation between the vocalized [o ~ ʊ ~ ɯ], dark non-vocalized [ɫ] and clear non-vocalized [l], depending on the word. These alternations happen in final positions or in a final consonant cluster, e.g. sold (pronounced [sɔʊd]). In London, that may even occur before a vowel: girl out [ɡɛo ˈæoʔ]. In all phonetic environments, male London speakers were at least twice as likely to vocalize the dark l as female London speakers. According to Ladefoged & Maddieson (1996), the vocalized dark l is sometimes an unoccluded lateral approximant, which differs from the RP [ɫ] only by the lack of the alveolar contact.

/l/-vocalization can lead to loss of distinctions between some vowels and diphthongs. Examples of vowel mergers before historical /l/ found in EE are:

- /iːl/ (as in REEL) merges with /ɪəl/ (as in REAL).
- /ɔɪl/ (as in OIL) merges with /ɔɪəl/ (as in ROYAL).
- /aʊl/ (as in OWL) merges with /aʊəl/ (as in VOWEL).
- Other possible mergers include the following:
  - /iːl/ (as in FEEL) can merge with /ɪl/ (as in FILL). Since /ɪəl/ merges with /iːl/, it also participates in this merger.
  - /uːl/ (as in POOL) can merge with both /ʊl/ (as in PULL) and /ɔːl/ (as in PAUL).
  - /eɪl/ (as in VEIL) can merge with both /æl/ (as in VAL) and /aʊəl/ (as in VOWEL).
  - /ɛl/ (as in WELL) can merge with /ɜːl/ (as in WHIRL).
  - /aɪl/ (as in CHILD'S) can merge with /ɑːl/ (as in CHARLES).
  - /ɒl/ (as in DOLL) can merge with /ɒʊl/ (as in DOLE).

Przedlacka (2001) found coda /l/ pronounced as clear [l], as in most accents of Irish English, in some speakers: she notes that in her study, "all four Essex speakers have a clear [l] in pull."

/l/-vocalization appears to be spreading into RP (or GB, the similar accent referred to by some writers). Collins et al say "Traditional RP speakers tend to stigmatize this feature, which is nevertheless one of the most striking changes going on in present-day GB English".

==== /t/-glottalization ====
The term glottalization has several different meanings: the most important are glottal reinforcement (or pre-glottalization), where a glottal closure accompanies an oral closure, and glottal replacement, where a glottal closure is substituted for an oral consonant.

Although glottalization of /t/ has been singled out for attention in discussion of EE features, pre-glottalization of /p/, /k/ and /tʃ/ is also widespread in RP, particularly when another consonant follows. Examples are "popcorn" [ˈpɒʔpkɔːn], "electric" [ɪˈleʔktrɪk], "butcher" [ˈbʊʔtʃə]. Wells proposes that in transcribing EE, the glottal stop symbol [ʔ] could be used in contexts where the consonant in question is preceded by a vowel and followed by a consonant or the end of a word: examples are "bit" [bɪʔ], "football" [ˈfʊʔbɔo], "belt" [beoʔ], "Cheltenham" [ˈtʃeoʔnəm], "bent" [benʔ], "Bentley" [ˈbenʔli]. Pre-glottalization of /t/ therefore appears to be present both in RP and in EE.

Glottal replacement of /t/ may be found when /t/ occurs before another consonant. Examples from RP where /t/ is replaced by a glottal stop are: "that table" [ˌðæʔ ˈteɪbəl], "Scotland" [ˈskɒʔlənd], "witness" [ˈwɪʔnəs]. The most extreme case of glottal replacement is when a glottal stop takes the place of /t/ between vowels (normally when the preceding vowel is stressed). Examples are "not on" [ˌnɒʔ ˈɒn], "bottle" [ˈbɒʔo]. Wells says "glottalling word-internally before a vowel is well-known as a "rough" pronunciation variant: thus EE water ˈwɔːtə, but Cockney ˈwɔʊʔə". However, in work published twenty years later, Cruttenden (p 184) remarks that such glottal replacement "was until recently stigmatized as non-GB but all except [ʔl̩] are now acceptable in London RGB" (i.e. EE). He continues "Use of [ʔ] for /t/ word-medially intervocalically, as in water, still remains stigmatized in GB".

==== Diphthong shift ====
EE is said to exhibit diphthong shift, particularly of the FACE, PRICE, MOUTH and GOAT vowels (informal example: "nime" for "name").

- /əʊ/ (as in GOAT) may be realised in a couple of different ways. According to Przedlacka (2001), it is any of the following: [əʊ], [ɐʊ], [əʏ] or [ɐʏ]. The last two are more often used by women. She also notes a fully rounded diphthong [oʊ] (found in some speakers from Essex), as well as two rare monophthongal realizations, namely [ɐː] and [o̞ː].
- /eɪ/ (as in FACE), can be realised as [ɛ̝ɪ], [ɛɪ], [ɛ̞ɪ] or [æɪ], with [ɛɪ] and [ɛ̞ɪ] being predominant. it can also be realised as [eɪ], [ɐɪ] or [ʌɪ].
- /aɪ/ (as in PRICE) can be realised as [aɪ], [a̠ɪ], [ɑ̟ɪ], [ɒ̟ɪ], [ɑɪ] or [ɒɪ].
- /aʊ/ (as in MOUTH) can be realised as [aʊ], [aʏ], [æə], [æʊ] or [æʏ]. [a] denotes a front onset [a], not a central one [a̠].
- Board /bɔːd/ may be pronounced differently from bored /bɔəd/. /ɔː/ (phonetically [ɔʊ] or [oː]) appears before consonants, and /ɔə/ (phonetically [ɔə] or [ɔː]) appears at a morpheme boundary. However, Przedlacka (2001) states that both /ɔː/ and /ɔə/ may have the same monophthongal quality [ɔː].

==== Yod-coalescence ====
Yod-coalescence is found in EE: the use of the affricates [d͡ʒ] and [t͡ʃ] instead of the clusters [dj] and [tj] in words like dune and Tuesday results in the words sounding like June and choose day, respectively. Although at the time when most studies of EE were carried out, yod-coalescence was not common in RP, it has now become so widely accepted that RP-based pronunciation dictionaries include it. Thus the latest edition of the Cambridge English Pronouncing Dictionary gives /dʒuːn/ and /tʃuːz.deɪ/ as the preferred pronunciations; the Longman Pronunciation Dictionary and the Oxford Dictionary of Pronunciation give /djuːn/ and /tjuːzdeɪ/ as their first preference, but give /dʒuːn/ and /tʃuːz.deɪ/ as second preference. It cannot be said that the presence of yod-coalescence distinguishes EE from RP.

==== th-fronting ====
It has been suggested that th-fronting is "currently making its way" into Estuary English, for example those from the Isle of Thanet often refer to Thanet as "Plannit Fannit" (Planet Thanet). However, this feature was also present in the traditional dialect of Essex before the spread of Estuary English.

==== Other vowel differences ====
- /iː/ (as in FLEECE) can be realised as [iː], [ɪi] or [əi], with the first two variants predominating. Before the dark l, it is sometimes a center diphthong [iə].
- /uː/ (as in GOOSE) can be realised in many different ways, such as monophthongs [ʏː], [ɪ̝ː], [ʉː], [ɨː], [ʉ̠ː], [u̟ː] and diphthongs [ɘɵ], [ɘʏ], [ʏɨ] and [ʊu]. Front pronunciations ([ʏː], [ɪ̝ː], [ɘʏ] and [ʏɨ]) are more often encountered in women. Before dark /l/, it is always back.
- /ʊ/ (as in FOOT) can be realised as [ʉ], [ɨ], [ʏ] or [ʊ], as in RP. Only the last variant appears before a dark l.
- /ɔː/ (as in THOUGHT), according to Przedlacka (2001), can be pronounced in two different ways: diphthongal [oʊ] in closed syllables and [ɔə] or [ɔ̝ə] in open syllables and monophthongal [ɔː]. According to Parsons (1998), it is either [ɔʊ] or [oː] before consonants, and either [ɔə] or [ɔː] at a morpheme boundary.
- /ʌ/ (as in STRUT) can be realised as [ɒ], [ʌ], [ɐ], [ɐ̟] or [æ], with [ɐ] being predominant. The first two variants occur mostly before /ŋ/. The last two variants are more often used by women.
- /æ/ (as in TRAP) can be realised as [a], [a̝], [æ], [ɛ̞] or [ɛ].

=== Features distinguishing EE from Cockney ===
Wells suggests that EE differs from Cockney in a few key features:

- EE differs from Cockney in usually not being characterized by H-dropping before stressed vowels (informal example: "'and on 'eart" for "hand on heart")
- Th-fronting (e.g. "I fink" for "I think", but see above)
- Cockney may have monophthongal realization of the MOUTH vowel ("Sahfend" for "Southend").

== Use ==
Estuary English is widely encountered throughout southeast England, particularly among the young. It is considered to be a working-class accent, although often used by the lower middle classes too. In the debate that surrounded a 1993 article about Estuary English, a London businessman claimed that Received Pronunciation was perceived as unfriendly, so Estuary English was now preferred for commercial purposes. Some adopt the accent as a means of "blending in" to appear to be more working class or in an attempt to appear to be "a common man". That affectation of the accent is sometimes derisively referred to as "Mockney". A move away from traditional RP accents is almost universal among middle-class young people in the South-East of England.

== 19th-century Rural Estuary English ==
Older rural dialects of the Estuary region survived longest in areas like Kent and the east of Essex, which early on showed features of, as well as some features distinct from, the modern Estuary dialect that has since become regionally widespread. Notably, rhoticity was a feature of older rural English in most of the Estuary counties, now largely replaced by non-rhoticity.

== See also ==
- List of dialects of English
- Regional accents of English
- English language in Southern England
- Multicultural London English

== Bibliography ==
- Altendorf, Ulrike (1999), "Estuary English: is English going Cockney?" (PDF), Moderna Språk, 93 (1): 1–11, doi:10.58221/mosp.v93i1.9709, S2CID 254296882
- Altendorf, Ulrike (2016), "Caught between Aristotle and Miss Marple... – A proposal for a perceptual prototype approach to 'Estuary English'", Complutense Journal of English Studies, 24 (24): 131–154, doi:10.5209/CJES.54452
- Altendorf, Ulrike; Watt, Dominic (2004), "The dialects in the South of England: phonology", in Schneider, Edgar W.; Burridge, Kate; Kortmann, Bernd; Mesthrie, Rajend; Upton, Clive (eds.), A handbook of varieties of English, Vol. 1: Phonology, Mouton de Gruyter, pp. 181–196, ISBN 3-11-017532-0
- Ashby, Patricia (2011), "The l-vocalization trend in young London English speech: growing or declining?", English Phonetics (14–15), English Phonetic Society of Japan: 36–45
- Bauer, Laurie; Warren, Paul; Bardsley, Dianne; Kennedy, Marianna; Major, George (2007), "New Zealand English", Journal of the International Phonetic Association, 37 (1): 97–102, doi:10.1017/S0025100306002830
- Cruttenden, Alan (2014), Gimson's Pronunciation of English (8th ed.), Routledge, ISBN 9781444183092
- Crystal, David (2003), The Cambridge Encyclopedia of the English Language, Cambridge University Press, ISBN 978-0521530330
- Foulkes, P; Docherty, G (1999), Urban Voices, Arnold, ISBN 0-340-70608-2
- Ladefoged, Peter; Maddieson, Ian (1996). The Sounds of the World's Languages. Oxford: Blackwell. ISBN 0-631-19815-6.
- Lodge, Ken (2009), A Critical Introduction to Phonetics, Continuum International Publishing Group, ISBN 978-0-8264-8873-2
- Parsons, Gudrun (1998), From "RP" to "Estuary English": The concept 'received' and the debate about British pronunciation standards (PDF), University of Hamburg – via Psychology and Language Sciences – University College London
- Przedlacka, Joanna (2001), "Estuary English and RP: Some Recent Findings" (PDF), Studia Anglica Posnaniensia, 36: 35–50
- Roach, Peter (2009), English Phonetics and Phonology (4th ed.), Cambridge University Press, ISBN 978-0-521-71740-3
- Trudgill, Peter (1999), The Dialects of England (2nd ed.), Wiley, ISBN 0-631-21815-7
- Wells, John C. (1982), "4.2 London", Accents of English 2: The British Isles, Cambridge: Cambridge University Press, pp. 301–334, ISBN 0-521-24224-X
- Wells, John C. (1994), "Transcribing Estuary English: a discussion document", Speech Hearing and Language: UCL Work in Progress, 8: 259–267
