= Setter (disambiguation) =

Setter is a type of gundog.

Setter or Setters may also refer to:

- Setter (surname)
- Maurice Setters (1936–2020), English football player and manager
- Bone setter, a folk medicine practitioner
- Setter (computer science), in object-oriented programming
- Setter (volleyball), volleyball position
- Setter (crossword), a crossword compiler in British English
- Setters (film), a 2019 Indian Hindi-language crime thriller film
- HMS Setter, a Royal Navy ship of the First World War

== See also ==
- Setter Hill (disambiguation)
