= Flapping =

Phonetic change of /t/ and /d/ between vowels

Flapping or tapping, also known as alveolar flapping, intervocalic flapping, or t-voicing, is a phonological process involving the phonemes /t/ and sometimes /d/ being pronounced as voiced alveolar taps or flaps [ɾ] (sounds produced by briefly tapping the alveolar ridge with the tongue) when occurring between vowels.

It is found in many varieties of English, especially North American, Cardiff, Ulster, Australian and New Zealand English. In London English, the flapped [ɾ] is perceived as a casual pronunciation intermediate between the affricate [tsʰ] with higher class associations, and the glottal stop [ʔ] with lower class associations. In these named varieties, outside of Britain, /d/, the voiced counterpart of /t/, is also frequently pronounced as a flap in such positions, making pairs of words like latter and ladder sound similar or identical. In similar positions, the combination /nt/ may be pronounced as a nasalized flap [ɾ̃], making winter sound similar or identical to winner.

Flapping of /t/ is sometimes perceived as the replacement of /t/ with /d/; for example, the word butter pronounced with flapping may be heard as "budder".

In other dialects of English, such as South African English, Scottish English, some Northern England English (like Scouse), and older varieties of Received Pronunciation, the flap is a variant of /r/ (see Pronunciation of English /r/).

== Terminology and articulation ==
The terms flap and tap are often used synonymously, although some authors make a distinction between them. The Americanist phonetic notation uses the small majuscule letter ⟨ᴅ⟩ for the tap, and the standard IPA ⟨ɾ⟩ for the flap. When the distinction is made, a flap involves a rapid backward and forward movement of the tongue tip, while a tap involves an upward and downward movement. Linguists disagree on whether the sound produced in the present process is a flap or a tap, and by extension on whether the process is better called flapping or tapping, while flapping has traditionally been more widely used. Derrick & Gick (2011) identify four types of sounds produced in the process: alveolar tap, down-flap, up-flap, and postalveolar tap (found in autumn, Berta, otter, and murder, respectively).

In Cockney, another voiced variant of /t/ that has been reported to occur to coexist with the alveolar tap (and other allophones, such as the very common glottal stop) is a simple voiced alveolar stop [d], which occurs especially in the words little [ˈlɪdʊ], hospital [ˈɒspɪdʊ] and whatever [wɒˈdɛvə]. That too results in a (variable) merger with /d/, whereas the tap does not.

In Cardiff English, the alveolar tap is less rapid than the corresponding sound in traditional RP, being more similar to /d/. It also involves a larger part of the tongue. Thus, the typical Cardiff pronunciation of hospital as [ˈɑspɪɾl̩] or [ˈɑspɪɾʊ] is quite similar to Cockney [ˈɒspɪdʊ], though it does not involve a neutralization of the flap with [d].

== Distribution ==
Examples of flapping in American English
"Betty Botter" tongue twister
A recitation of the tongue twister "Betty Botter" with flapping

Pronunciation of latter and ladder with and without flapping
[ˈlætɚ ˈlædɚ ˈlæɾɚ]

Pronunciation of winter and winner with and without flapping
[ˈwɪntɚ ˈwɪnɚ ˈwɪɾ̃ɚ]

Pronunciation of seventy with and without t-voicing, and with flapping
[ˈsɛvn̩ti ˈsɛvn̩di ˈsɛvɨɾ̃i]

Flapping of /t/ and /d/ is a prominent feature of North American English. Some linguists consider it obligatory for most American dialects to flap /t/ between a stressed and an unstressed vowel. Flapping of /t/ also occurs in Australian, New Zealand and (especially Northern) Irish English, and more infrequently or variably in South African English, Cockney, and Received Pronunciation.

The exact conditions for flapping in North American English are unknown, although it is widely understood that it occurs in an alveolar stop, /t/ or /d/, when placed between two vowels, provided the second vowel is unstressed (as in butter, writing, wedding, loader). Across word boundaries, however, it can occur between any two vowels, provided the second vowel begins a word (as in get over [ɡɛɾˈoʊvɚ]). This extends to morphological boundaries within compound words (as in whatever [ˌwʌɾˈɛvɚ]). In addition to vowels, segments that may precede the flap include /r/ (as in party) and occasionally /l/ (as in faulty). Flapping after /l/ is more common in Canadian English than in American English. Syllabic /l/ may also follow the flap (as in bottle). Flapping of /t/ before /ən/ (as in button) is observed in Australian English. In North American English, [t] and [ʔ] (t-glottalization) were the only realizations of /t/ before /ən/, but studies in the 2020s have found [ɾ] in younger US speakers.

Morpheme-internally, the vowel following the flap must not only be unstressed but also be a reduced one (namely /ə/, morpheme-final or prevocalic /i, oʊ/, or /ɪ/ preceding /ŋ/, /k/, etc. (Note: Since North American English normally lacks the distinction between /ɪ/ and /ə/ in unstressed positions, there is variability among linguists and dictionaries in the treatment of unstressed vowels pronounced as /ɪ/ in other varieties of English that have the distinction. They are usually identified as /ɪ/ before palato-alveolar and velar consonants (/ʃ, tʃ, dʒ, k, ɡ, ŋ/) and in prefixes such as re-, e-, de-, and as /ə/ elsewhere.)), so words like botox, retail, and latex are not flapped in spite of the primary stress on the first syllables, while pity, motto, and Keating can be. The second syllables in the former set of words can thus be considered as having secondary stress.

Word-medial flapping is also prohibited in foot-initial positions. This prevents words such as militaristic, spirantization, and Mediterranean from flapping, despite capitalistic and alphabetization, for example, being flapped. This is known as the Withgott effect.

In North American English, the cluster /nt/ (but not /nd/) in the same environment as flapped /t/ may be realized as a nasal flap [ɾ̃]. Intervocalic /n/ is also often realized as a nasal flap, so words like winter and winner can become homophonous. According to Wells (1982), in the United States, Southerners tend to pronounce winter and winner identically, while Northerners, especially those from the east coast, tend to retain the distinction, pronouncing winter with [ɾ̃] or [nt] and winner with [n].

Given these intricacies, it is difficult to formulate a phonological rule that accurately predicts flapping. Nevertheless, Vaux (2000) postulates that it applies to alveolar stops:

- after a sonorant other than l, m, or ŋ, but with restrictions on n;
- before an unstressed vowel within words, or before any vowel across a word boundary;
- when not in foot-initial position.

Exceptions include the preposition/particle to and words derived from it, such as today, tonight, tomorrow, and together, wherein /t/ may be flapped when intervocalic (as in go to sleep [ˌɡoʊɾəˈslip]). In Australian English, numerals thirteen, fourteen, and eighteen are often flapped despite the second vowel being stressed. In a handful of words such as seventy, ninety, and carpenter, /nt/ is frequently pronounced as [nd], retaining /n/ and voicing /t/, although it may still become [ɾ̃] in rapid speech.

== Homophony ==
Flapping is a specific type of lenition, specifically intervocalic weakening. It leads to the neutralization of the distinction between /t/ and /d/ in appropriate environments, a partial merger of the two phonemes, provided that both /t/ and /d/ are flapped. Some speakers, however, flap only /t/ but not /d/. Yet, for a minority of speakers, the merger can occur only if neither sound is flapped. That is the case in Cockney, where /t/ is occasionally voiced to [d], yielding a variable merger of little and Lidl. For speakers with the merger, the following utterances sound the same or almost the same:

Homophonous pairs
| /-t-, -nt-/ | /-d-, -n-/ | IPA | Notes |
|---|---|---|---|
| aborting | aboarding | əˈbɔɹɾɪŋ | |
| alighted | elided | əˈlaɪɾəd | With weak vowel merger. |
| ante | Annie | ˈæɾ̃i | |
| anti- | Annie | ˈæɾ̃i | |
| auntie | Annie | ˈæɾ̃i | |
| atom | Adam | ˈæɾəm | |
| at 'em | add 'em | ˈæɾəm | |
| banter | banner | ˈbæɾ̃əɹ | |
| batter | badder | ˈbæɾəɹ | |
| batty | baddie | ˈbæɾi | |
| beating | beading | ˈbiːɾɪŋ | |
| Bertie | birdie | ˈbəɹɾi | With fern–fir–fur merger. |
| Bertie | Birdy; Birdie | ˈbəɹɾi | With fern–fir–fur merger. |
| betting | bedding | ˈbɛɾɪŋ | |
| biting | biding | ˈbaɪɾɪŋ | |
| bitter | bidder | ˈbɪɾəɹ | |
| bitting | bidding | ˈbɪɾɪŋ | |
| bitty | biddy | ˈbɪɾi | |
| blatter | bladder | ˈblæɾəɹ | |
| bleating | bleeding | ˈbliːɾɪŋ | |
| boating | boding | ˈboʊɾɪŋ | |
| bruter | brooder | ˈbɹuːɾəɹ | With yod-dropping after /ɹ/. |
| butting | budding | ˈbʌɾɪŋ | |
| butty | buddy | ˈbʌɾi | |
| canter | canner | ˈkæɾ̃əɹ | |
| canton | cannon | ˈkæɾ̃ən | |
| canton | canon | ˈkæɾ̃ən | |
| carting | carding | ˈkɑɹɾɪŋ | |
| catty | caddy | ˈkæɾi | |
| centre; center | sinner | ˈsɪɾ̃əɹ | With pen–pin merger. |
| chanting | Channing | ˈt͡ʃæɾ̃ɪŋ | |
| cited | sided | ˈsaɪɾɪd | |
| sited | sided | ˈsaɪɾɪd | |
| sighted | sided | ˈsaɪɾɪd | |
| citer | cider | ˈsaɪɾəɹ | Without Canadian raising. |
| sighter | cider | ˈsaɪɾəɹ | Without Canadian raising. |
| clotting | clodding | ˈklɒɾɪŋ, ˈklɑɾɪŋ | |
| coating | coding | ˈkoʊɾɪŋ | |
| courting | chording | ˈkɔɹɾɪŋ | With horse–hoarse merger. |
| courting | cording | ˈkɔɹɾɪŋ | With horse–hoarse merger. |
| cuttle | cuddle | ˈkʌɾəl | |
| cutty | cuddy | ˈkʌɾi | |
| daughter | dodder | ˈdɑɾəɹ | With cot–caught merger. |
| daunting | dawning | ˈdɔɾ̃ɪŋ | |
| daunting | donning | ˈdɑɾ̃ɪŋ | With cot–caught merger. |
| debtor | deader | ˈdɛɾəɹ | |
| diluted | deluded | dɪˈluːɾəd | |
| don't it | doughnut | ˈdoʊɾ̃ət | With weak vowel merger and toe–tow merger. |
| dotter | dodder | ˈdɑɾəɹ | |
| doughty | dowdy | ˈdaʊɾi | Without Canadian raising. |
| eluted | alluded | əˈluːɾəd | With weak vowel merger. |
| eluted | eluded | ɪˈluːɾəd | |
| enter | in a | ˈɪɾ̃ə | In non-rhotic accents with pen–pin merger. |
| enter | inner | ˈɪɾ̃əɹ | With pen–pin merger. |
| eta | Ada | ˈeɪɾə | |
| fated | faded | ˈfeɪɾɪd | |
| flutter | flooder | ˈflʌɾəɹ | |
| fontal | faunal | ˈfɑɾ̃əl | With cot–caught merger. |
| futile | feudal | ˈfjuːɾəl | With weak vowel merger. |
| garter | guarder | ˈɡɑɹɾəɹ | |
| gaunter | goner | ˈɡɑɾ̃əɹ | With cot–caught merger. |
| goated | goaded | ˈɡoʊɾəd | |
| grater | grader | ˈɡɹeɪɾəɹ | |
| grader | grader | ˈɡɹeɪɾəɹ | |
| gritted | gridded | ˈɡɹɪɾəd | |
| gritty | Griddy | ˈɡɹɪɾi | |
| hearty | hardy | ˈhɑːɹɾi | |
| heated | heeded | ˈhiːɾɪd | With meet–meat merger. |
| Hetty; Hettie | heady | ˈhɛɾi | |
| hurting | herding | ˈhɜːɹɾɪŋ | With fern–fir–fur merger. |
| inter- | in a | ˈɪɾ̃ə | In non-rhotic accents. |
| inter- | inner | ˈɪɾ̃əɹ | |
| iter | eider | ˈaɪɾəɹ | Without Canadian raising. |
| jaunty | Johnny | ˈd͡ʒɑɾ̃i | With cot–caught merger. |
| jointing | joining | ˈd͡ʒɔɪɾ̃ɪŋ | |
| kitted | kidded | ˈkɪɾɪd | |
| kitty | kiddie | ˈkɪɾi | |
| knotted | nodded | ˈnɒɾɪd, ˈnɑɾɪd | |
| latter | ladder | ˈlæɾəɹ | |
| lauded | lotted | ˈlɑɾəd | With cot–caught merger. |
| linty | Lenny | ˈlɪɾ̃i | With pen–pin merger. |
| liter | leader | ˈliːɾəɹ | With meet–meat merger. |
| little | Lidl | ˈlɪɾəl | |
| looter | lewder | ˈluːɾəɹ | With yod-dropping after /l/. |
| manta | manna | ˈmæɾ̃ə | |
| manta | manner | ˈmæɾ̃ə | In non-rhotic accents. |
| manta | manor | ˈmæɾ̃ə | In non-rhotic accents. |
| Marty | Mardi | ˈmɑːɹɾi | In the term Mardi Gras. |
| matter | madder | ˈmæɾəɹ | |
| mattocks | Maddox | ˈmæɾəks | |
| meant it | minute | ˈmɪɾ̃ɪt | With pen–pin merger. |
| metal | medal | ˈmɛɾəl | |
| mettle | meddle | ˈmɛɾəl | |
| minty | many | ˈmɪɾ̃i | With pen–pin merger. |
| minty | mini | ˈmɪɾ̃i | |
| minty | Minnie | ˈmɪɾ̃i | |
| motile | modal | ˈmoʊɾəl | With weak vowel merger. |
| mottle | model | ˈmɑɾəl | |
| mutter | mudder | ˈmʌɾəɹ | |
| neater | kneader | ˈniːɾəɹ | |
| neuter | nuder | ˈnuːɾəɹ, ˈnjuːɾəɹ, ˈnɪuɾəɹ | |
| nighter | nidor | ˈnaɪɾəɹ | Without Canadian raising. |
| nitre; niter | nidor | ˈnaɪɾəɹ | |
| noted | noded | ˈnoʊɾɪd | |
| oater | odour; odor | ˈoʊɾəɹ | |
| otter | odder | ˈɒɾəɹ, ˈɑɾəɹ | |
| painting | paining | ˈpeɪɾ̃ɪŋ | |
| panting | panning | ˈpæɾ̃ɪŋ | |
| parity | parody | ˈpæɹəɾi | With weak vowel merger |
| patter | padder | ˈpæɾəɹ | |
| patting | padding | ˈpæɾɪŋ | |
| patty | paddy | ˈpæɾi | |
| petal | pedal | ˈpɛɾəl | |
| pettle | peddle | ˈpɛɾəl | |
| platted | plaided | ˈplæɾəd | |
| planting | planning | ˈplæɾ̃ɪŋ | |
| pleating | pleading | ˈpliːɾɪŋ | |
| plenty | Pliny | ˈplɪɾ̃i | With pen–pin merger. |
| plotting | plodding | ˈplɒɾɪŋ, ˈplɑɾɪŋ | |
| potted | podded | ˈpɒɾəd, ˈpɑɾəd | |
| pouter | powder | ˈpaʊɾəɹ | Without Canadian raising. |
| punting | punning | ˈpʌɾ̃ɪŋ | |
| putting | pudding | ˈpʊɾɪŋ | |
| rated | raided | ˈɹeɪɾɪd | With pane–pain merger. |
| rattle | raddle | ˈɹæɾəl | |
| righting | riding | ˈɹaɪɾɪŋ | Without Canadian raising. |
| writing | riding | ˈɹaɪɾɪŋ | Without Canadian raising. |
| roti | roadie | ˈɹoʊɾi | |
| rooter | ruder | ˈɹuːɾəɹ | With yod-dropping after /ɹ/. |
| router | ruder | ˈɹuːɾəɹ | With yod-dropping after /ɹ/. |
| rotting | rodding | ˈɹɒɾɪŋ, ˈɹɑɾɪŋ | |
| runty | runny | ˈɹʌɾ̃i | |
| rutty | ruddy | ˈɹʌɾi | |
| sainting | seining | ˈseɪɾ̃ɪŋ | |
| Saturday | sadder day | ˈsæɾəɹdeɪ | |
| satyr | Seder | ˈseɪɾəɹ | |
| saunter | sauna | ˈsɔɾ̃ə | In non-rhotic accents. |
| scented | synod | ˈsɪɾ̃əd | With pen–pin merger. |
| scenting | sinning | ˈsɪɾ̃ɪŋ | With pen–pin merger. |
| seating | seeding | ˈsiːɾɪŋ | With meet–meat merger. |
| sent it | senate | ˈsɛɾ̃ɪt | With weak vowel merger. |
| set it | said it | ˈsɛɾɪt | |
| shunting | shunning | ˈʃʌɾ̃ɪŋ | |
| shutter | shudder | ˈʃʌɾəɹ | |
| sinter | sinner | ˈsɪɾ̃əɹ | |
| skitting | skidding | ˈskɪɾɪŋ | |
| sorted | sordid | ˈsɔɹɾɪd | With weak vowel merger. |
| slighting | sliding | ˈslaɪɾɪŋ | Without Canadian raising. |
| stunting | stunning | ˈstʌɾ̃ɪŋ | |
| tarty | tardy | ˈtɑɹɾi | |
| tenter | tenner | ˈtɛɾ̃əɹ | |
| tenter | tenor | ˈtɛɾ̃əɹ | |
| tenting | tinning | ˈtɪɾɪŋ | With pen–pin merger. |
| title | tidal | ˈtaɪɾəl | Without Canadian raising. |
| toting | toading | ˈtoʊɾɪŋ | |
| traitor | trader | ˈtɹeɪɾəɹ | With pane–pain merger. |
| tutor | Tudor | ˈtuːɾəɹ, ˈtjuːɾəɹ, ˈtɪuɾəɹ | |
| tweeted | tweeded | ˈtwiːɾəd | |
| utter | udder | ˈʌɾəɹ | |
| waiter | wader | ˈweɪɾəɹ | With pane–pain merger. |
| wattle | waddle | ˈwɑɾəl | |
| weighted | waded | ˈweɪɾəd | With pane–pain merger. |
| wetting | wedding | ˈwɛɾɪŋ | |
| winter | winner | ˈwɪɾ̃əɹ | |
| wheated | weeded | ˈwiːɾəd | With wine–whine merger. |
| whiter | wider | ˈwaɪɾəɹ | With wine–whine merger and without Canadian raising. |

In New Zealand, Māori loanwords may retain the original [ɾ] pronunciation of ⟨r⟩. This, in combination with flapping, leads to homophones such as Kura and coulda, both pronounced [kʊɾə].

In accents characterized by Canadian raising, such words as riding and writing may be flapped yet still distinguished by the quality of the vowel: riding [ˈɹaɪɾɪŋ], writing [ˈɹʌɪɾɪŋ]. Vowel duration may also be different, with a longer vowel before /d/ than before /t/, due to pre-fortis clipping.

== Withgott effect ==
In a dissertation in 1982, M. M. Withgott demonstrated that, among speakers of American English, words seem to be chunked into pronunciation units she referred to as a foot, similar to a metrical unit in poetry. Such chunking was said to block flapping in the word ‘Mediterranean’ ([[Medi[terranean] ], cf. [ [sub[terranean]]). How a word is chunked relates to its morphological derivation, as seen by contrasting morphologically similar pairs such as the following (where the vertical bar shows where Withgott argued there is boundary between neighboring feet):

| Initial-type t | | vs. | flapped-t |
| military | [ˈmɪlɨ | tʰɛɹi] | vs. | capital | [ˈkʰæpɨɾl̩] |
| militaristic | [ˌmɪlɨ | tʰəˈɹɪstɪk] | vs. | capitalistic | [ˌkʰæpɨɾə | ˈlɪstɪk] |

The medial t in càpitalístic can be flapped as easily as in post-stress cátty [ˈkʰæɾi], in contrast to the medial t in mìlitarístic, which comes at the beginning of a foot, and so must be pronounced as [tʰ], like a t at the beginning of a word.

Long, seemingly monomorphemic words also are chunked in English for purposes of pronunciation. In such words [t]’s — as well as the other unvoiced stops — are pronounced like initial segments whenever they receive secondary stress or are at the beginning of a foot.

== T-to-R rule ==
The T-to-R rule is a phenomenon in certain accents of English in which the flapping of /t/ is subsequently reinterpreted as the flap variant of /r/. As a result, in most such accents, this type of /t/ is then replaced by the prevailing variant of /r/ in English, the approximant [ɹ]. However, studies have found that the rule is more restrictive that usual flapping rules, with the phenomenon occurring only in a particular set of frequently used words and mainly across word boundaries (in phrases), but only very rarely does it occur word-internally (thus, it is common in shut up but much rarer in shutting).

The application of the rule means that shut in the phrasal verb shut up /ʃʌrˈʌp/ can be analysed as having a different phonemic form than the citation form of the verb shut /ʃʌt/. Other examples of phrases where [ɹ] can replace [t] in such accents include get off, let us, that again, forget all, bought it, and what is.

The T-to-R rule has been reported to occur primarily in certain 19th- or 20th-century working-class dialects, including of the English Midlands and Northern England (where it is always stigmatized) such as Geordie, older Cockney (London), certain local Dublin accents of Ireland, the Cardiff dialect of Wales (where the merged consonant can surface as either an approximant or a flap), some South African English (where only a flap is possible), and some Scottish English. In the Cardiff dialect, the rule is typically applied between any vowel (including long vowels) and /ə/ or the reduced /ɪ/ (also across word boundaries), so that starting /ˈstaːtɪŋ/ and starring /ˈstaːrɪŋ/ can be homophonous as [ˈstaːɹɪn ~ ˈstaːɾɪn]. In South African English, the merger is possible only for those speakers who use the flapped allophone of /r/ (making the starting–starring minimal pair homophonous as [ˈstɑːɾɪŋ]), otherwise the sounds are distinguished as a flap (or a voiceless stop) for /t/ ([ˈstɑːɾɪŋ ~ stɑːtɪŋ]) vs. approximant for /r/ ([ˈstɑːɹɪŋ]). There, the merger occurs word-internally between vowels in those environments where flapping is possible in North American English.

Homophonous pairs
| /t/ | /r/ | IPA | Notes |
|---|---|---|---|
| battle | barrel | ˈbæɾəl | |
| batty | Barrie | ˈbæɾi | |
| batty | Barry | ˈbæɾi | |
| Betty, bet he | berry | ˈbɛɾi | |
| but a | borough | ˈbəɾə | In Cardiff English. But has an alternative form /bə/, with an elided /t/. |
| butter | borough | ˈbʌɾə | |
| catty | carry | ˈkæɾi | |
| catty | kar(r)ee | ˈkæɾi | |
| daughter | Dora | ˈdɔːɾə | |
| Fetty | ferry | ˈfɛɾi | |
| hotter | horror | ˈhɒɾə | |
| jetty | jerry | ˈd͡ʒɛɾi | |
| Lottie, lot he | lorry | ˈlɒɾi | |
| matty | marry | ˈmæɾi | |
| otter | horror | ˈɒɾə | With h-dropping. |
| petty | Perry | ˈpɛɾi | |
| starting | starring | ˈstɑːɾɪŋ | |
| tarty | tarry | ˈtɑːɾi | Tarry in the sense "resembling tar". |

== See also ==
- Phonological history of English consonants
- Regional accents of English

== Bibliography ==
- Bérces, Katalin Balogné (2011). "Weak and semiweak phonological positions in English". Journal of English Studies. 9: 75–96. doi:10.18172/jes.160.
- Boberg, Charles (2015). "North American English". In Reed, Marnie; Levis, John M. (eds.). The Handbook of English Pronunciation. Wiley. pp. 229–250. doi:10.1002/9781118346952.ch13. ISBN 978-1-11831447-0.
- Brinton, Laurel J.; Fee, Margery (2001). "Canadian English". In Algeo, John (ed.). The Cambridge History of the English Language. Vol. VI: English in North America. Cambridge University Press. pp. 422–440. doi:10.1017/CHOL9780521264792.013. ISBN 0-521-26479-0.
- Collins, Beverley; Mees, Inger M. (1990), "The Phonetics of Cardiff English", in Coupland, Nikolas; Thomas, Alan Richard (eds.), English in Wales: Diversity, Conflict, and Change, Multilingual Matters Ltd., pp. 87–103, ISBN 1-85359-032-0
- de Jong, Kenneth (1998). "Stress-related variation in the articulation of coda alveolar stops: flapping revisited". Journal of Phonetics. 26 (3): 283–310. doi:10.1006/jpho.1998.0077.
- Derrick, Donald; Gick, Bryan (2011). "Individual variation in English flaps and taps: a case of categorical phonetics". Canadian Journal of Linguistics. 56 (3): 307–319. doi:10.1017/S0008413100002024. S2CID 231889893.
- Fox, Kirsten (2011). VCE English Language: Exam Guide (2nd ed.). Insight Publications. ISBN 978-1-92141193-9.
- Goldsmith, John (2011). "The Syllable". In Goldsmith, John; Riggle, Jason; Yu, Alan C. L. (eds.). The Handbook of Phonological Theory (2nd ed.). Wiley-Blackwell. pp. 164–196. doi:10.1002/9781444343069.ch6. ISBN 978-1-4051-5768-1.
- Gussenhoven, Carlos; Jacobs, Haike (2017). Understanding Phonology (4th ed.). Routledge. ISBN 978-1-35197471-4.
- Hayes, Bruce (1995). Metrical Stress Theory: Principles and Case Studies. University of Chicago Press. ISBN 0-22632104-5.
- Hayes, Bruce (2009). Introductory Phonology. Blackwell. ISBN 978-1-4051-8411-3.
- Hickey, Raymond (2007). Irish English: History and Present-day Forms. Cambridge University Press. ISBN 978-0-521-85299-9.
- Horvath, Barbara M. (2004). "Australian English: phonology". In Schneider, Edgar W.; Burridge, Kate; Kortmann, Bernd; Upton, Clive (eds.). A Handbook of Varieties of English. Vol. 1: Phonology. Mouton de Gruyter. pp. 625–644. doi:10.1515/9783110175325.1.625. ISBN 3-11-017532-0. S2CID 243507016.
- Hualde, José Ignacio (2011). "Sound Change". In van Oostendorp, Marc; Ewen, Colin J.; Hume, Elizabeth; Rice, Keren (eds.). The Blackwell Companion to Phonology: Volume IV – Phonological Interfaces. Wiley-Blackwell. pp. 2214–2235. ISBN 978-1-40518423-6.
- Iverson, Gregory K.; Ahn, Sang-Cheol (2007). "English voicing in dimensional theory" (PDF). Language Sciences. 29 (2–3): 247–269. doi:10.1016/j.langsci.2006.12.012. PMC 2390816. PMID 18496590. Archived from the original (PDF) on 15 April 2012.
- Jones, Daniel (2011). Roach, Peter; Setter, Jane; Esling, John (eds.). Cambridge English Pronouncing Dictionary (18th ed.). Cambridge University Press. ISBN 978-0-521-15255-6.
- Ladefoged, Peter; Johnson, Keith (2011). A Course in Phonetics (6th ed.). Wadsworth. ISBN 978-1-42823126-9.
- Ogden, Richard (2009). An Introduction to English Phonetics. Edinburgh University Press. ISBN 978-0-7486-2541-3.
- Repetti-Ludlow, Chiara (2026). "The Realization of /t/ and /ən/ in Words Like button: A Change in Progress on Long Island". American Speech. 101 (1): 3–19. doi:10.1215/00031283-11109413.
- Repetti-Ludlow, Chiara; Blake, Renee (2024). "You Best Button [bʌɾən] it up: An American English Change-in-progress with People Identified as Black Taking the Lead". University of Pennsylvania Working Papers in Linguistics. 30 (2): 100–108. hdl:20.500.14332/60615.
- Shockey, Linda (2003). Sound Patterns of Spoken English. Blackwell. ISBN 0-63123079-3.
- Tollfree, Laura (2001). "Variation and change in Australian consonants: reduction of /t/". In Blair, David; Collins, Peter (eds.). English in Australia. John Benjamins. pp. 45–67. doi:10.1075/veaw.g26.06tol. ISBN 90-272-4884-2.
- Trudgill, Peter; Hannah, Jean (2008). International English: A Guide to the Varieties of Standard English (5th ed.). Routledge. ISBN 978-0-340-97161-1.
- Vaux, Bert (2000). Flapping in English (PDF). Linguistic Society of America. Chicago. Archived from the original (PDF) on 15 June 2001.
- Wells, John C. (1982). Accents of English. Vol. 1: An Introduction (pp. i–xx, 1–278), Vol. 2: The British Isles (pp. i–xx, 279–466), Vol. 3: Beyond the British Isles (pp. i–xx, 467–674). Cambridge University Press. doi:10.1017/CBO9780511611759, doi:10.1017/CBO9780511611766. ISBN 0-52129719-2, 0-52128540-2, 0-52128541-0.
- Wells, John C. (2000). Longman Pronunciation Dictionary (2nd ed.). Harlow: Pearson Education. ISBN 0-582-36467-1.
- Wells, John C. (25 March 2011). "strong and weak". John Wells's phonetic blog.
