= Received Pronunciation =

Standard accent for British English

Received Pronunciation (RP) is an accent of British English regarded as the standard accent of England, carrying high social prestige since the late 19th and especially early 20th century. It is recognised and influential throughout the whole English-speaking world. The study of RP is concerned only with matters of pronunciation, while other features of standard British English, such as vocabulary, grammar, and style, are not considered.

Linguists have long disagreed on RP's name, exact definition, geographic neutrality, number of speakers, classification in terms of sub-varieties, appropriateness as a standard, and historical origins. Furthermore, RP has changed to such a degree over the last century that many of its early 20th-century traditions of transcription and analysis have become outdated or are no longer considered evidence-based by scholars. Still, the older traditions of RP analysis continue to be commonly taught and used, for instance in language education and comparative linguistics, and RP remains a popular umbrella term in British society.

Standard Southern British English (SSBE) is a label some linguists prefer for the more recent variety of southeastern England that, since the late 20th century, has gradually evolved and diverged from earlier 20th-century RP or that is a newer standard accent of Southern England. While this new variant has risen in prestige, the early 20th-century variety of RP, also commonly referred to as the Queen's English or King's English, has diminished. There is no academic consensus about the terminology for these concepts; thus, some authors regard SSBE (or other terms) as entirely distinct from RP, while others use RP in a way that encompasses 21st-century SSBE. This article covers both topics.

== Etymology and history ==
Although a form of Standard English had roughly been established in the City of London by the end of the 15th century, its accent(s) did not resemble the phonetics of Received Pronunciation until the later 19th century. RP developed during that time, emerging as a non-rhotic dialect of southeastern England, developing among the Golden Triangle of universities composed of London, Oxford, and Cambridge, as well as the prestigious fee-charging public schools that fed them, such as Eton, Harrow and Rugby.

The term (generally) received pronunciation was used by French-American linguist P. S. Du Ponceau in 1818 to discuss very generic English phonology, though the Oxford English Dictionary cites quotations even back to about 1710. In the 1860s, English phonetician Alexander John Ellis used received pronunciation to mean a general, unmarked pronunciation of British English used by educated speakers, cautioning: "There is no such thing as a uniform educated pron. of English, and rp. and rs is a variable quantity differing from individual to individual, although all its varieties are 'received', understood and mainly unnoticed". By the turn of the century, the accent had become fairly uniform.

In the first edition of the English Pronouncing Dictionary (1917), phonetician Daniel Jones referred to the accent as "public school pronunciation", saying "It is convenient for present purposes to choose as the standard of English pronunciation the form which appears to be most generally used by Southern English persons who have been educated at the great English public boarding schools". For the second edition in 1926 he writes: "In what follows I call it Received Pronunciation, for want of a better term", establishing that name as an enduring specific label in linguistics. In 1922, the BBC formed under Sir John Reith, selecting educated and aristocratic southeastern English as its broadcasting standard, citing its being widely understood globally as the reason. In 1924, Reith explicitly promoted the BBC's educational responsibility to use this form of "correct" spoken English, which he called the "King's English". A similar term, received standard, was coined by Henry C. K. Wyld in 1927.

According to the prescriptive Fowler's Modern English Usage (1965), "the correct term is 'the Received Pronunciation'. The word 'received' conveys its original meaning of 'accepted' or 'approved', as in 'received wisdom'."

=== Alternative names ===
Some linguists have used the abbreviation "RP" while expressing reservations about its suitability. The Cambridge-published English Pronouncing Dictionary (aimed at those learning English as a foreign language) uses the phrase "BBC Pronunciation", on the basis that the name "Received Pronunciation" is "archaic" and that BBC News presenters no longer suggest high social class and privilege to their listeners. Other writers have also used the name "BBC Pronunciation". The term 'The Queen's English' has also been used by some writers.

The phonetician Jack Windsor Lewis frequently criticised the name "Received Pronunciation" in his blog: he has called it "invidious", a "ridiculously archaic, parochial and question-begging term" and noted that American scholars find the term "quite curious". He used the term "General British" (to parallel "General American") in his 1970s publication of A Concise Pronouncing Dictionary of American and British English and in subsequent publications. The name "General British" is adopted in the latest revision of Gimson's Pronunciation of English. Beverley Collins and Inger Mees use the term "Non-Regional Pronunciation" for what is often otherwise called RP, and reserve the term "Received Pronunciation" for the "upper-class speech of the twentieth century". Received Pronunciation has sometimes been called "Oxford English", as it used to be the accent of most members of the University of Oxford. The Handbook of the International Phonetic Association uses the name "Standard Southern British". Page 4 reads:

Standard Southern British (where 'Standard' should not be taken as implying a value judgment of 'correctness') is the modern equivalent of what has been called 'Received Pronunciation' ('RP'). It is an accent of the south east of England which operates as a prestige norm there and (to varying degrees) in other parts of the British Isles and beyond.

=== Sub-varieties ===
Faced with the difficulty of defining a single standard of RP, some researchers have tried to distinguish between sub-varieties:

- Gimson (1962) proposed Conservative, General, and Advanced; "Conservative RP" referred to a traditional accent associated with older speakers with certain social backgrounds; General RP was considered neutral regarding age, occupation or lifestyle of the speaker; and Advanced RP referred to speech of a younger generation of speakers. Later editions (e.g., Gimson 2008) use the terms General, Refined and Regional RP. In the latest revision of Gimson's book, the terms preferred are General British (GB), Conspicuous GB and Regional GB.
- Wells (1982) refers to "mainstream RP" and "U-RP"; he suggests that Gimson's categories of Conservative and Advanced RP referred to the U-RP of the old and young respectively. However, Wells stated, "It is difficult to separate stereotype from reality" with U-RP. Writing on his blog in February 2013, Wells wrote, "If only a very small percentage of English people speak RP, as Trudgill et al. claim, then the percentage speaking U-RP is vanishingly small" and "If I were redoing it today, I think I'd drop all mention of 'U-RP'".
- Upton distinguishes between RP (which he equates with Wells's "mainstream RP"), Traditional RP (after Ramsaran 1990), and an even older version which he identifies with Cruttenden's "Refined RP".
- An article on the website of the British Library refers to Conservative, Mainstream and Contemporary RP.

== Prevalence and perceptions ==
Traditionally, Received Pronunciation has been associated with high social class. It was the "everyday speech in the families of Southern English persons whose men-folk [had] been educated at the great public boarding-schools" and which conveyed no information about that speaker's region of origin before attending the school. An 1891 teacher's handbook stated, "It is the business of educated people to speak so that no-one may be able to tell in what county their childhood was passed". Nevertheless, in the 19th century some British prime ministers, such as William Ewart Gladstone (b. 1809), still spoke with some regional features.

Opinions differ over the proportion of Britons who speak RP. Trudgill estimated 3% in 1974, but that rough estimate has been questioned by J. Windsor Lewis. Upton notes higher estimates of 5% (Romaine, 2000) and 10% (Wells, 1982) but refers to these as "guesstimates" not based on robust research.

The claim that RP is non-regional is disputed, since it is most commonly found in London and the southeast of England. It is defined in the Concise Oxford English Dictionary as "the standard accent of English as spoken in the South of England", and alternative names such as "Standard Southern British" have been used. Despite RP's historic high social prestige in Britain, being seen as the accent of those with power, money, and influence, it may be perceived negatively by some as being associated with undeserved, or accidental, privilege and as a symbol of the southeast's political power in Britain. Based on a 1997 survey, British linguist Jane Stuart-Smith wrote, "RP has little status in Glasgow, and is regarded with hostility in some quarters". A 2007 survey found that residents of Scotland and Northern Ireland tend to dislike RP. It is shunned by some with left-wing political views, who may be proud of having accents more typical of the working classes.

Since the Second World War, and increasingly since the 1960s, a wider acceptance of regional English varieties has taken hold in education and public life. Nonetheless, surveys from 1969 to 2022 consistently show that RP is perceived as the most prestigious accent of English in the United Kingdom. In 2022, 25% of British adults reported being mocked for their regional accent at work, and 46% in social situations.

== Use ==
=== Media ===
In the early days of British broadcasting, speakers of English origin almost universally used RP. The first director-general of the BBC, Lord Reith, encouraged the use of a 'BBC accent' because it was a "style or quality of English which would not be laughed at in any part of the country". He distinguished the BBC accent from the 'Oxford accent', to which he was "vehemently opposed". In 1926 the BBC established an Advisory Committee on Spoken English with distinguished experts, including Daniel Jones, to advise on the correct pronunciation and other aspects of broadcast language. The Committee was dissolved on the outbreak of the Second World War. While the BBC did advise its speakers on pronunciation, there was never a formalised official BBC pronunciation standard. A notable departure from the use of RP came with the Yorkshire-born newsreader Wilfred Pickles during the Second World War; his accent allowing listeners to more clearly distinguish BBC broadcasts from German propaganda, though Pickles had modified his accent to be closer to RP. Since the Second World War RP has played a much smaller role in broadcast speech. RP remains the accent most often heard in the speech of English-born announcers and newsreaders on BBC Radio 3 and Radio 4, and in some TV channels, but non-RP accents are now more widely encountered.

=== Dictionaries ===
Most English dictionaries published in Britain (including the Oxford English Dictionary) give phonetically transcribed RP pronunciations (using RP's traditional phonology) for all words. Pronunciation dictionaries represent a special class of dictionary giving a wide range of possible pronunciations: British pronunciation dictionaries are all based on RP, though do not necessarily use that name. Daniel Jones transcribed RP pronunciations of words and names in the English Pronouncing Dictionary. Cambridge University Press continues to publish this title, as of 1997 edited by Peter Roach. Two other pronunciation dictionaries are in common use: the Longman Pronunciation Dictionary, compiled by John C. Wells (using the name "Received Pronunciation"), and Clive Upton's Oxford Dictionary of Pronunciation for Current English, now republished as The Routledge Dictionary of Pronunciation for Current English.

=== Language teaching ===
Pronunciation forms an essential component of language learning and teaching; a model accent is necessary for learners to aim at, and to act as a basis for description in textbooks and classroom materials. RP has been the traditional choice for teachers and learners of British English. However, the choice of pronunciation model is difficult, and the adoption of RP is in many ways problematic.

== Traditional phonology ==
A standard system for representing RP was developed in the early and mid-20th century by English phoneticians such as Daniel Jones and his colleague A. C. Gimson. The vowel system below specifically follows Gimson (1962). Despite speakers born since that time diverging from this accent and certain transcriptional conventions becoming outdated, the system remains fairly common in accent coaching and language learning worldwide.

=== Consonants ===
Consonant phonemes
	Labial		Dental		Alveolar		Post- alveolar		Palatal	Velar		Glottal
Nasal		m				n					ŋ	
Stop	p	b			t	d				k	ɡ	
Affricate							tʃ	dʒ				
Fricative	f	v	θ	ð	s	z	ʃ	ʒ				h
Approximant						l		r	j		w	

Nasals and liquids (/m/, /n/, /ŋ/, /r/, /l/) may be syllabic in unstressed syllables. The consonant /r/ in RP is generally a postalveolar approximant, which would normally be expressed with the sign [ɹ] in the International Phonetic Alphabet, but the sign /r/ is nonetheless traditionally used for RP in most of the literature on the topic.

Voiceless plosives (/p/, /t/, /k/, /tʃ/) are aspirated at the beginning of a syllable, unless a completely unstressed vowel follows. (For example, the /p/ is aspirated in "impasse", with primary stress on "-passe", but not "compass", where "-pass" has no stress.) Aspiration does not occur when /s/ precedes in the same syllable, as in "spot" or "stop". When a sonorant /l/, /r/, /w/, or /j/ follows, this aspiration is indicated by partial devoicing of the sonorant. /r/ is a fricative when devoiced.

Syllable final /p/, /t/, /tʃ/, and /k/ may be either preceded by a glottal stop (glottal reinforcement) or, in the case of /t/, fully replaced by a glottal stop, especially before a syllabic nasal (bitten [ˈbɪʔn̩]). The glottal stop may be realised as creaky voice; thus, an alternative phonetic transcription of attempt [əˈtʰemʔt] could be [əˈtʰemm̰t].

As in other varieties of English, voiced plosives (/b/, /d/, /ɡ/, /dʒ/) are partly or even fully devoiced at utterance boundaries or adjacent to voiceless consonants. The voicing distinction between voiced and voiceless sounds is reinforced by a number of other differences, with the result that the two sets of consonants can clearly be distinguished even in the presence of devoicing of voiced sounds:

- Aspiration of voiceless consonants syllable-initially
- Glottal reinforcement of /p, t, k, tʃ/ syllable-finally
- Shortening of vowels before voiceless consonants

As a result, some authors prefer to use the terms fortis and lenis in place of voiceless and voiced. However, the latter are traditional and in more frequent usage.

The voiced dental fricative (/ð/) is more often a weak dental plosive; the sequence /nð/ in phrases like even then is often realised as [n̪n̪] (a long dental nasal). /l/ has velarised allophone ([ɫ]) in the syllable rhyme. /h/ becomes voiced ([ɦ]) between voiced sounds.

Some conservative RP speakers in England may use /hw/ for ⟨wh⟩, which often reflects a conscious choice rather than being a natural feature of their accent.

=== Vowels ===
Monophthongs of a fairly conservative variety of RP. From Roach (2004, p. 242)

Monophthongs of a 21st-century variety of RP. Adapted from Cruttenden (2014)

Ranges of the weak vowels in RP and GA. From Wells (2008, p. XXV)

Allophones of some RP monophthongs, from Collins & Mees (2003:92, 95, 101). The red ones occur before dark /l/, and the blue one occurs before velars.

Monophthongs ("Short")
	Front	Central	Back	
	Front	Central	unrounded	rounded
Close	ɪ	ʊ		
Mid	e	ə	ʌ	ɒ
Open	æ			

Examples of short vowels: /ɪ/ in kit, mirror and rabbit, /ʊ/ in foot and cook, /e/ in dress and merry, /ʌ/ in strut and curry, /æ/ in trap and marry, /ɒ/ in lot and orange, /ə/ in ago and sofa.

Monophthongs ("Long")
	Front	Central	Back
Close	iː	uː	
Mid	ɛː	ɜː	ɔː
Open			ɑː

Examples of long vowels: /iː/ in fleece, /uː/ in goose, /ɛː/ in bear, /ɜː/ in nurse and furry, /ɔː/ in north, force and thought, /ɑː/ in father and start.

The long mid front vowel /ɛː/ is elsewhere transcribed with the traditional symbols ⟨ɛə, eə⟩. The predominant realisation in modern RP is monophthongal.

==== "Long" and "short" vowels ====
Many conventional descriptions of the RP vowel system group the non-diphthongal vowels into the categories "long" and "short". This should not be taken to mean that RP has minimal pairs in which the only difference is vowel length. "Long" and "short" are convenient cover terms for a number of phonetic features. The long-short pairings shown above include also differences in vowel quality.

The vowels called "long" high vowels in RP /iː/ and /uː/ are slightly diphthongised, and are often narrowly transcribed in phonetic literature as diphthongs [ɪi] and [ʊu]. (Note: Roach (2009, p. 20)'s notes on one of the reasons for not treating these two phonemes as diphthongs: "I mention above that iː, uː are often pronounced as slightly diphthongal: although this glide is often noticeable, I have never found it helpful to try to teach foreign learners to pronounce iː, uː in this way.") The starting point of the diphthongal /uː/ can be either close to [ʊ] or a more centralised and even unrounded [ɨ̞], and its narrow transcriptions could be either [ʊu] or [ɨ̞ɯ̈].

Vowels may be phonologically long or short (i.e. belong to the long or the short group of vowel phonemes) but their length is influenced by their context: in particular, they are shortened if a voiceless (fortis) consonant follows in the syllable, so that, for example, the vowel in bat [bæʔt] is shorter than the vowel in bad [bæˑd]. The process is known as pre-fortis clipping. Thus phonologically short vowels in one context can be phonetically longer than phonologically long vowels in another context. For example, the vowel called "long" /iː/ in reach /riːtʃ/ (which ends with a voiceless consonant) may be shorter than the vowel called "short" /ɪ/ in the word ridge /rɪdʒ/ (which ends with a voiced consonant). Wiik, cited in (Cruttenden 2014), published durations of English vowels with a mean value of 172 ms for short vowels before voiced consonants but a mean value of 165 ms for long vowels preceding voiceless consonants.

In natural speech, the plosives /t/ and /d/ often have no audible release utterance-finally, and voiced consonants are partly or completely devoiced (as in [b̥æˑd̥]); thus the perceptual distinction between pairs of words such as bad and bat, or seed and seat rests mostly on vowel length (though the presence or absence of glottal reinforcement provides an additional cue).

Unstressed vowels are both shorter and more centralised than stressed ones. In unstressed syllables occurring before vowels and in final position, contrasts between long and short high vowels are commonly neutralised and short [i] and [u] occur (e.g. throughout [θɹuˈaʊʔt]). The neutralisation is common throughout many other English dialects as well, though the phonetic realisation of word-final [i] in traditional RP tends to remain open [ɪ], thus happy as [ˈhæpɪ] (unlike modern RP, which has undergone a phenomenon called happy-tensing).

According to phonetician Jane Setter, the typical pronunciation of the short variant of /uː/ is a weakly rounded near-close near-back rounded vowel [ʊ̜].

==== Diphthongs and triphthongs ====
Diphthongs of RP. From Roach (2004, p. 242)

Closing diphthongs of 21st-century RP (with the diphthongal realisations of /iː/ and /uː/). Adapted from Cruttenden (2014)

Centring diphthongs of RP. Adapted from Cruttenden (2014)

Diphthong	Example	
Closing
/eɪ/	/beɪ/	bay
/aɪ/	/baɪ/	buy
/ɔɪ/	/bɔɪ/	boy
/əʊ/	/bəʊ/	beau
/aʊ/	/baʊ/	bough
Centring
/ɪə/	/bɪə/	beer
/ʊə/	/bʊə/	boor

The centring diphthongs are gradually being eliminated in RP. The vowel /ɔə/ (as in door, boar) had largely merged with /ɔː/ by the Second World War, and the vowel /ʊə/ (as in poor, tour) has more recently merged with /ɔː/ as well among most speakers, although the sound /ʊə/ is still found in conservative speakers, and in less common words such as boor. See CURE–FORCE merger. More recently /ɛə/ has become a pure long vowel /ɛː/, as explained above. /ɪə/ is increasingly pronounced as a monophthong [ɪː], although without merging with any existing vowels.

The diphthong /əʊ/ is pronounced by some RP speakers in a noticeably different way when it occurs before /l/, if that consonant is syllable-final and not followed by a vowel (the context in which /l/ is pronounced as a "dark l"). The realisation of /əʊ/ in this case begins with a more back, rounded and sometimes more open vowel quality; it may be transcribed as [ɔʊ] or [ɒʊ]. It is likely that the backness of the diphthong onset is the result of allophonic variation caused by the raising of the back of the tongue for the /l/. If the speaker has "l-vocalization" the /l/ is realised as a back rounded vowel, which again is likely to cause backing and rounding in a preceding vowel as coarticulation effects. This phenomenon has been discussed in several blogs by John C. Wells. In the recording included in this article the phrase "fold his cloak" contains examples of the /əʊ/ diphthong in the two different contexts. The onset of the pre-/l/ diphthong in "fold" is slightly more back and rounded than that in "cloak".

RP also possesses the triphthongs /aɪə/ as in tire, /aʊə/ as in tower, /əʊə/ as in lower, /eɪə/ as in layer and /ɔɪə/ as in loyal. There are different possible realisations of these items: in slow, careful speech they may be pronounced as two syllables with three distinct vowel qualities in succession, or as a monosyllabic triphthong. In more casual speech the middle vowel may be considerably reduced, by a process known as smoothing, and in an extreme form of this process the triphthong may even be reduced to a single long vowel. In such a case the difference between /aʊə/, /aɪə/, and /ɑː/ in tower, tire, and tar may be neutralised with all three units realised as [ɑː] or [äː]. This type of smoothing is known as the tower–tire, tower–tar and tire–tar mergers.

Triphthongs
As two syllables	Triphthong	Loss of mid-element	Further simplified as	Example
[aɪ.ə]	[aɪə]	[aːə]	[aː]	tire
[ɑʊ.ə]	[ɑʊə]	[ɑːə]	[ɑː]	tower
[əʊ.ə]	[əʊə]	[əːə]	[ɜː]	lower
[eɪ.ə]	[eɪə]	[ɛːə]	[ɛː]	layer
[ɔɪ.ə]	[ɔɪə]	[ɔːə]	[ɔː]	loyal

==== BATH vowel ====
There are differing opinions as to whether /æ/ in the BATH lexical set can be considered RP. The pronunciations with /ɑː/ are invariably accepted as RP. The English Pronouncing Dictionary does not admit /æ/ in BATH words and the Longman Pronunciation Dictionary lists them with a § marker of non-RP status. John Wells, who grew up in the north of England and uses /ɑː/ in "bath" and "glass", considers this the only acceptable phoneme in RP. Others have argued that /æ/ is too categorical in the north of England to be excluded. Clive Upton believes that /æ/ in these words must be considered within RP and has called the opposing view "south-centric". Upton's Oxford Dictionary of Pronunciation for Current English gives both variants for BATH words. A. F. Gupta's survey of mostly middle-class students found that /æ/ was used by almost everyone who was from clearly north of the isogloss for BATH words. She wrote, "There is no justification for the claims by Wells and Mugglestone that this is a sociolinguistic variable in the north, though it is a sociolinguistic variable on the areas on the border [the isogloss between north and south]". In a study of speech in West Yorkshire, K. M. Petyt wrote that "the amount of /ɑː/ usage is too low to correlate meaningfully with the usual factors", having found only two speakers (both having attended boarding schools in the south) who consistently used /ɑː/.

Jack Windsor Lewis has noted that the Oxford Dictionary's position has changed several times on whether to include short /æ/ within its prescribed pronunciation. The BBC Pronouncing Dictionary of British Names uses only /ɑː/, but its author, Graham Pointon, has stated on his blog that he finds both variants to be acceptable in place names.

Some research has concluded that many people in the North of England have a dislike of the /ɑː/ vowel in BATH words. A. F. Gupta wrote, "Many of the northerners were noticeably hostile to /ɡrɑːs/, describing it as 'comical', 'snobbish', 'pompous' or even 'for morons'." K. M. Petyt wrote that several respondents "positively said that they did not prefer the long-vowel form or that they really detested it or even that it was incorrect". Mark Newbrook has assigned this phenomenon the name "conscious rejection", and has cited the BATH vowel as "the main instance of conscious rejection of RP" in his research in West Wirral.

==== French words ====
John Wells has argued that, as educated British speakers often attempt to pronounce French names in a French way, there is a case for including /ɒ̃/ (as in bon), and /æ̃/ and /ɜ̃ː/ (as in vingt-et-un), as marginal members of the RP vowel system. He also argues against including other French vowels on the grounds that not many British speakers succeed in distinguishing the vowels in bon and banc, or in rue and roue. However, the Cambridge English Pronouncing Dictionary draws a distinction between /ɒ̃/ (there rendered as /ɔ̃ː/) and the unrounded /ɑ̃ː/ of banc for a total of four nasal vowels.

== Modern phonology ==
Scholars noted the standard accent of southern England changing by the last quarter of the 20th century, including Gimson in 1980. Clive Upton devised a modified system for the Shorter Oxford English Dictionary (1993), intended to phonetically reflect more modern RP. His changes to five symbols from the traditional Gimson system are now used in many other Oxford University Press dictionaries; the differences are shown in the table below.

Upton's reform
Lexical set (example)	Traditional symbol	Upton's reform symbol
DRESS	/e/	/ɛ/
TRAP	/æ/	/a/
NURSE	/ɜː/	/əː/
SQUARE	/eə/	/ɛː/
PRICE	/aɪ/	/ʌɪ/

Since the 2010s, Geoff Lindsey, arguing that the system of transcription once used for RP has become outdated, and calling his target accent Standard Southern British English (SSBE), proposed a new system as a replacement. Lindsey's system is as follows—differences between it and standard transcription are depicted with the traditional transcription in parentheses.

Lindsey's proposed analysis of the British English vowel system
Short		Long					
Lexical set	Associated character	r-liaison		j-diphthongs		w-diphthongs	
Lexical set	Associated character	Lexical set	Associated character	Lexical set	Associated character	Lexical set	Associated character
kit	/ɪ/	near	/ɪː/ (ɪə)	fleece	/ɪj/ (iː)		
dress	/ɛ/ (e)	square	/ɛː/ (ɛə)	face	/ɛj/ (eɪ)		
trap	/a/ (æ)	start	/ɑː/	price	/ɑj/ (aɪ)	mouth	/aw/ (ɑʊ)
foot	/ɵ/ (ʊ)	cure	/ɵː/ (ʊə)			goose	/ʉw/ (uː)
lot	/ɔ/ (ɒ)	north	/oː/ (ɔː)	choice	/oj/ (ɔɪ)	goat	/əw/ (əʊ)
commA	/ə/	nurse	/əː/ (ɜː)			goat	/əw/ (əʊ)
strut	/ʌ/	nurse	/əː/ (ɜː)			goat	/əw/ (əʊ)

== Historical variation ==
Like all accents, RP has changed with time. For example, sound recordings and films from the first half of the 20th century demonstrate that it was usual for speakers of RP to pronounce the /æ/ sound, as in land, with a vowel close to [ɛ], so that land would sound similar to a present-day pronunciation of lend. RP is sometimes known as the Queen's English, but recordings show that even Queen Elizabeth II shifted her pronunciation over the course of her reign, ceasing to use an [ɛ]-like vowel in words like land. The change in RP may be observed in the home of "BBC English". The BBC accent of the 1950s is distinctly different from today's: a news report from the 1950s is recognisable as such, and a mock-1950s BBC voice is used for comic effect in programmes wishing to satirise 1950s social attitudes such as the Harry Enfield Show and its "Mr. Cholmondley-Warner" sketches.

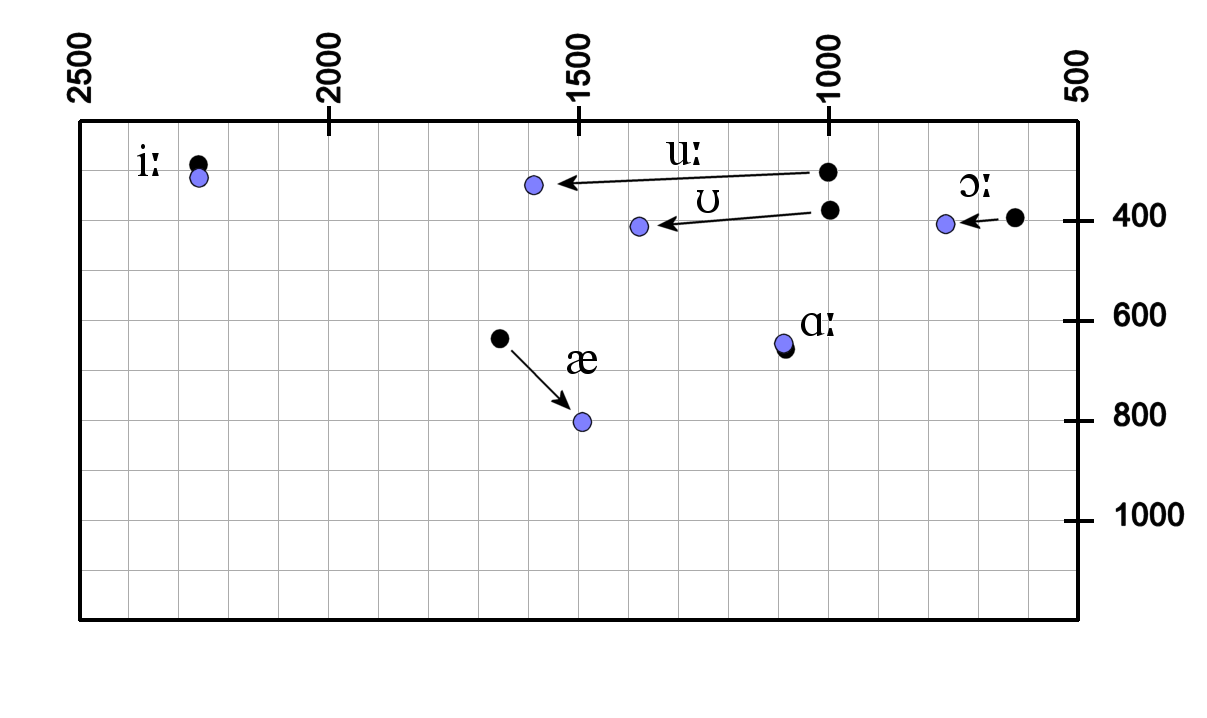
A comparison of the formant values of /iː æ ɑː ɔː ʊ uː/ for older (black) and younger (light blue) RP speakers. From de Jong et al. (2007, p. 1814)

A few illustrative examples of changes in RP during the 20th century and early 21st are given below. A more comprehensive list (using the name "General British" in place of "RP") is given in Gimson's Pronunciation of English.

=== Vowels ===
- Words such as CLOTH, gone, off, often, cross were pronounced with /ɔː/ instead of /ɒ/, since as late as the early 20th century. So, often and orphan were homophones (see lot–cloth split). Queen Elizabeth II continued to use these older pronunciations, but it is now rare to hear this on the BBC.
- Linguist Joseph Wright, writing in 1905, and other early RP scholars show a distinction between horse and hoarse with an extra diphthong /ɔə/ appearing in words like hoarse, FORCE, and pour. The symbols used by Wright are slightly different: the sound in fall, law, saw is transcribed as /oː/ and that in more, soar, etc. as /oə/. Daniel Jones gives an account of the /ɔə/ diphthong, but notes "many speakers of Received English (sic), myself among them, do not use the diphthong at all, but replace it always by /ɔː/". This distinction had become obsolete in RP by the late 20th century.
- The vowel in words such as tour, moor, sure used to be /ʊə/, but this has merged with /ɔː/ for most modern speakers. The effect of these two mergers (horse-hoarse and moor-more) is to bring about a number of three-way mergers of items which were hitherto distinct, such as poor, paw and pore (/pʊə/, /pɔː/, /pɔə/) all becoming /pɔː/.
- The DRESS vowel and the starting point of the FACE diphthong has become lowered from mid [e̞] to open-mid [ɛ].
- The starting point of the CHOICE diphthong has raised from [ɔɪ] to [oɪ].
- Before the Second World War, the vowel of cup was a back vowel close to cardinal [ʌ], though low central [ɐ] was also a variant. [ʌ] is increasingly used in modern RP to avoid the clash with the lowered variety of /æ/ in the [a] region (the trap-strut merger).
- There has been a change in the pronunciation of the unstressed final vowel of happy as a result of a process known as happY-tensing: an older pronunciation of happy would have had the vowel /ɪ/ whereas a more modern pronunciation has a vowel nearer to /iː/. In pronunciation handbooks and dictionaries it is now common to use the symbol /i/ to cover both possibilities.
- In a number of words where modern RP has an unstressed syllable with schwa /ə/, older pronunciations had /ɪ/, for instance, the final vowel in the following: kindness, doubtless, witness, witless, toilet, fortunate.
- The /ɛː/ phoneme (as in fair, care, there) was realised as a centring diphthong [ɛə] in the past, whereas most present-day speakers of RP pronounce it as a long monophthong [ɛː].
- The /ɪə/ (as in near, serious) and /ʊə/ (as in cure, rural; when not merged with /ɔː/) phonemes are also becoming monophthongised to [ɪː] and [ʊː~ɵː], though this is not yet as widespread as for /ɛː/.
- A change in the symbolisation of the GOAT diphthong reflects a change in the pronunciation of the starting point. Jones's 1918 account of this diphthong describes it as starting with [ö] (a slightly centralised and lowered close-mid back rounded vowel), moving towards [u]. The full symbol was often /ou/ or /oʊ/. Wells argues that this pronunciation likely persisted among those raised before the First World War, with a more central starting point employed after that time. In mid-20th-century and modern RP, the starting point is definitively unrounded and central, symbolised as /əʊ/. The fronted variant [ɛʊ] was once fashionable for those born between the world wars but became perceived as affected.
- The vowels in LOT and THOUGHT-NORTH-FORCE, traditionally transcribed as /ɒ/ and /ɔː/, have shifted upwards, and are now close to [ɔ] and [oː], respectively, in quality.
- The vowels in FOOT and GOOSE, traditionally transcribed as /ʊ/ and /uː/, have undergone fronting and reduction in the amount of lip-rounding (phonetically, these can be transcribed [ɵ̜] and [ʉ̜ː], respectively).
- As noted above, the TRAP vowel /æ/ has become more open, near to cardinal [a]. Wells writes that, in early 20th-century RP, strictly upper-class speakers could also use the diphthong [ɛæ] for TRAP, as can be heard by actors in films from that era.

Keyword	Dictionary	"Conservative" RP	"General" RP	SSBE (current norm)
Keyword	Dictionary	Jones (1918)	Gimson (1980)	Lindsey (2012)
commA	ə	ə		
lettER	ə	ə		
TRAP (lad)	æ, a	æ	æ~ɛ̞	a
TRAP (bad)	æ, a	æː	æː~ɛ̞ː	aː
BATH	ɑː	ɑː	ɑ̟ː~ɐ̞ː	ɑ̈ː~ʌ̞ː
PALM	ɑː	ɑː	ɑ̟ː~ɐ̞ː	ɑ̈ː~ʌ̞ː
START	ɑː	ɑː	ɑ̟ː~ɐ̞ː	ɑ̈ː~ʌ̞ː
LOT	ɒ	ɒ	ɒ	ɔ
CLOTH	ɒ	ɔ̞ː	ɒ, ɔ̝ː~o̞ː	ɔ
THOUGHT	ɔː	ɔ̞ː	ɔ̝ː~o̞ː	o̞ː
NORTH	ɔː	ɔ̞ː	ɔ̝ː~o̞ː	o̞ː
FORCE	ɔː	ɔə~ɔ̞ː	ɔ̝ː~o̞ː~ɔə	o̞ː
CURE	ʊə	ʊə	ɔː, ʊə	o̞ː, ɵː~ɤ̈ː
STRUT	ʌ	ʌ~ä	ä	ɐ~ʌ̈~ɑ̈
FOOT	ʊ	ʊ	ʊ~o̟	ɵ~ɤ̈
GOOSE	uː	uː~ʊu̟	ʊu~üː	ʊ̈ʉ~ʉː~ɨ̞ɯ̈
DRESS	e, ɛ	e̞	e̞	ɛ
KIT	ɪ	ɪ	ɪ	ɪ̞
happY	i	ɪ	ɪ	ɪi̯
FLEECE	iː	iː~ɪi~ii̯	ɪi~iː	ɪi̯
NEAR	ɪə	ɪə~ɪʌ	ɪə~ĭə	ɪ̞ː~ɪə
NURSE	ɜː, əː	ɜ̝ː	əː~ɜː	əː
FACE	eɪ	eɪ~ɛe	eɪ~e̞ɪ~ɛ̝ɪ~ɛɪ~ɛ̈ɪ	ɛɪ
SQUARE	ɛə, eə, ɛː	ɛə~ɛʌ	ɛə~e̞ə	ɛː
GOAT	oʊ, əʊ	öʊ	ʌ̈ɯ̈~æ̈ɤ̈	əʉ
PRICE	aɪ, ʌɪ	aɪ	äë~äɪ~æɪ~ɑ̈ɪ	ɑ̈ɪ~ʌ̞ɪ
MOUTH	aʊ	äʊ	ɑ̈ʊ~ɑ̈ö	aʊ
CHOICE	ɔɪ	ɔɪ	ɔ̞ɪ~o̞ɪ	oɪ

=== Consonants ===
- For speakers of Received Pronunciation in the late 19th century, it was common for the consonant combination ⟨wh⟩ (as in which, whistle, whether) to be realised as a voiceless labio-velar fricative /ʍ/ (also transcribed /hw/), as can still be heard in the 21st century in the speech of many speakers in Ireland, Scotland and parts of the US. Since the beginning of the 20th century, however, the /ʍ/ phoneme has ceased to be a feature of RP, except in an exaggeratedly precise style of speaking (the wine-whine merger).
- There has been considerable growth in glottalisation in RP, most commonly in the form of glottal reinforcement. This has been noted by writers on RP since quite early in the 20th century. Ward notes pronunciations such as [njuːʔtrəl] for neutral and [reʔkləs] for reckless. Glottalization of /tʃ/ is widespread in present-day RP when at the end of a stressed syllable, as in butcher [bʊʔtʃə].
- The realisation of /r/ as a tap or flap [ɾ] has largely disappeared from RP, though it can be heard in films and broadcasts from the first half of the 20th century. The word very was frequently pronounced [veɾɪ]. The same sound, however, is sometimes pronounced as an allophone of /t/ when it occurs intervocalically after a stressed syllable – the "flapped /t/" that is familiar in American English. Phonetically, this sounds more like /d/, and this pronunciation is sometimes known as /t/-voicing.
- Most RP speakers now pronounce /tʃ/ instead of /tj/ (e.g. tube and tutor) and /dʒ/ instead of /dj/ (e.g. dew and duty) in accented syllables. See Yod-coalescence.
- Most RP speakers no longer pronounce /j/ after /n/ in words such as news /nuːz/ and neuter /ˈnuːtə(r)/, likely due to influence from American English.

=== Word-specific changes ===
A number of cases can be identified where changes in the pronunciation of individual words, or small groups of words, have taken place.

- The word Mass (referring to the religious rite) was often pronounced /mɑːs/ in older versions of RP, but the word is now almost always /mæs/.
- The indefinite article an was traditionally used before a sounded /h/ if immediately followed by an unstressed vowel, as in an hyaena. This is now uncommon, especially in speech, and may be confined only to some of the more frequently used words, such as horrific and historical.

== Comparison with other varieties of English ==
- Like most other varieties of English outside Northern England, RP has undergone the foot–strut split: pairs like put/putt are pronounced differently.
- RP is a non-rhotic accent, so /r/ does not occur unless followed immediately by a vowel. Pairs such as father/farther, caught/court and formally/formerly are homophones.
- Unlike a number of North American English accents, RP has not undergone the Mary–marry–merry, nearer–mirror, or hurry–furry mergers: all these words are distinct from each other.
- Unlike many North American accents, RP has not undergone the father–bother or cot–caught mergers.
- RP does not have yod-dropping after /n/, /t/, /d/, /z/ and /θ/, but some speakers of RP have yod-dropping after /s/ and /l/. Hence, for example, new, tune, dune, resume and enthusiasm are pronounced /njuː/, /tjuːn/, /djuːn/, /rɪˈzjuːm/ and /ɪnˈθjuːziæzm/ rather than /nuː/, /tuːn/, /duːn/, /rɪˈzuːm/ and /ɪnˈθuːziæzm/. This contrasts with many East Anglian and East Midland varieties of English language in England and with many forms of American English, including General American. In words such as pursuit and allure, both pronunciations (with and without /j/) may be heard in RP, but major dictionaries only list the pronunciation with /j/ for pursuit. There are, however, several words where a yod has been lost with the passage of time: for example, the word suit originally had a yod in RP but this is now extremely rare.
- The flapped variant of /t/ and /d/ (as in much of the West Country, Ulster, most North American varieties including General American, Australian English, and the Cape Coloured dialect of South Africa) is not used very often.
- RP has undergone the wine–whine merger (so the sequence /hw/ is not present except among those who have acquired this distinction as the result of speech training). The Royal Academy of Dramatic Art, based in London, still teaches these two sounds for international breadth as distinct phonemes. They are also distinct from one another in most of Scotland and Ireland, in the northeast of England, and in the southeastern United States.
- Unlike some other varieties of English language in England, there is no h-dropping in words like head or horse. In hurried phrases such as "as hard as he could" h-dropping commonly applies to the word he.
- Unlike most Southern Hemisphere English and North American English accents, RP has not undergone the weak vowel merger, meaning that pairs such as Lenin/Lennon are distinct.
- In traditional RP [ɾ] is an allophone of /r/ (it is used intervocalically after a stressed syllable, after /θ, ð/ and sometimes even after /b, ɡ/).

== Spoken specimen ==
Specimen of Received Pronunciation
The audio recording on which the transcriptions are based

The Journal of the International Phonetic Association regularly publishes "Illustrations of the IPA" which present an outline of the phonetics of a particular language or accent. It is usual to base the description on a recording of the traditional story of the North Wind and the Sun. There is an IPA illustration of British English (Received Pronunciation).

The female speaker is described as having been born in 1953 and educated at Oxford University. To accompany the recording there are three transcriptions: orthographic, phonemic and allophonic.

Phonemic

ðə ˈnɔːθ ˈwɪnd ən ðə ˈsʌn wə dɪˈspjuːtɪŋ ˈwɪtʃ wəz ðə ˈstrɒŋɡə, wen ə ˈtrævl̩ə ˌkeɪm əˌlɒŋ ˈræpt ɪn ə ˈwɔːm ˈkləʊk. ðeɪ əˈɡriːd ðət ðə ˈwʌn hu ˈfɜːst səkˈsiːdɪd ɪn ˈmeɪkɪŋ ðə ˈtrævlə ˌteɪk hɪz ˈkləʊk ɒf ʃʊd bi kənˌsɪdəd ˈstrɒŋɡə ðən ði ˈʌðə. ˈðen ðə ˌnɔːθ wɪnd ˈbluː əz ˈhɑːd əz i ˈkʊd, bət ðə ˈmɔː hi ˈbluː ðə ˌmɔː ˈkləʊsli dɪd ðə ˈtrævlə ˈfəʊld hɪz ˌkləʊk əˈraʊnd hɪm, ænd ət ˈlɑːst ðə ˈnɔːθ wɪnd ˌɡeɪv ˈʌp ði əˈtempt. ˈðen ðə ˈsʌn ˌʃɒn aʊt ˈwɔːmli, ænd əˈmiːdiətli ðə ˈtrævlə ˈtʊk ɒf ɪz ˈkləʊk. n̩ ˌsəʊ ðə ˈnɔːθ ˈwɪn wəz əˈblaɪdʒd tʊ kənˈfes ðət ðə ˈsʌn wəz ðə ˈstrɒŋɡr̩ əv ðə ˈtuː.

Allophonic

ðə ˈnɔːθ ˈw̥ɪnd ən̪n̪ə ˈsʌn wə dɪˈspj̊u̟ːtɪŋ ˈwɪʔtʃ wəz ðə ˈstɹ̥ɒŋɡə, wen ə ˈtɹ̥ævl̩ə ˌkʰeɪm əˌlɒŋ ˈɹæptʰ ɪn ə ˈwɔːm ˈkl̥əʊkˣ. ðeɪ əˈɡɹ̥iːd̥ ð̥əʔ ðə ˈwʌn ɦu ˈfɜːs səkˈsiːdɪd ɪmˈmeɪxɪŋ ðə ˈtɹ̥ævlə ˌtʰeɪk̟x̟ɪs ˈkl̥əʊk ɒf ʃʊbbi kʰənˌsɪdəd̥ ˈstɹɒŋɡə ð̥ən̪n̪i ˈʌðə. ˈðen̪n̪ə ˌnɔːθ w̥ɪnd ˈbluː əz̥ ˈhɑːd̥ əs i ˈkʊd, bət̬ ð̥ə ˈmɔː hi ˈblu̟ː ðə ˌmɔ ˈkl̥əʊsl̥i d̥ɨd ð̥ə ˈtɹ̥æv̥lə ˈfəʊld̥ hɪz̥ ˌkl̥əʊkʰ əˈɹaʊnd hɪm, ænd ət ˈl̥ɑːst ð̥ə ˈnɔːθ w̥ɪnd ˌɡ̊eɪv̥ ˈʌp ði̥ əˈtʰemʔt. ˈðen̪n̪ə ˈsʌn ˌʃɒn aʊt ˈwɔːmli, ænd əˈmiːdiətl̥i ð̥ə ˈtɹ̥ævlə ˈtʰʊk ɒf ɪz̥ ˈkl̥əʊkˣ. n̩ ˌsəʊ ðə ˈnɔːθ ˈw̥ɪn wəz̥ əˈblaɪdʒ̊ tʰɵ kʰənˈfes ð̥əʔ ð̥ə ˈsʌn wəz̥z̥ə ˈstɹ̥ɒŋɡɹ̩ əv̥ ð̥ə ˈtʰu̟ː.

Orthographic

The North Wind and the Sun were disputing which was the stronger, when a traveller came along wrapped in a warm cloak. They agreed that the one who first succeeded in making the traveller take his cloak off should be considered stronger than the other. Then the North Wind blew as hard as he could, but the more he blew the more closely did the traveller fold his cloak around him, and at last the North Wind gave up the attempt. Then the Sun shone out warmly, and immediately the traveller took off his cloak. And so the North Wind was obliged to confess that the Sun was the stronger of the two.

== Notable speakers ==
David Attenborough's voice

Gyles Brandreth's voice

Stephen Fry's voice

The following people have been described as RP speakers:

- The British royal family
- Julie Andrews, actress and singer
- Rowan Atkinson, actor, comedian and writer
- David Attenborough, broadcaster and naturalist
- Richard Attenborough, actor and film director
- Tony Benn, politician and political activist
- Emily Blunt, actress
- Gyles Brandreth, broadcaster, writer and former politician
- David Cameron, former Prime Minister of the UK (2010–2016)
- Deborah Cavendish, Duchess of Devonshire, aristocrat and writer
- Grace Chatto, musician and cellist
- Noël Coward, playwright, composer and actor
- Alain de Botton, writer and public speaker
- Judi Dench, actress
- David Dimbleby, journalist and former presenter
- Rupert Everett, actor
- Julian Fellowes, actor, writer, producer, film director and politician
- Colin Firth, actor
- Lady Antonia Fraser, author and historian
- Stephen Fry, actor and writer
- Hugh Grant, actor
- Tom Hiddleston, actor
- Christopher Hitchens, author and journalist
- Jeremy Irons, actor
- Boris Johnson, former Prime Minister of the UK (2019–2022)
- Celia Johnson, actress
- Vanessa Kirby, actress
- Gertrude Lawrence, actress, singer, dancer and musical comedy performer
- Nigella Lawson, food writer and television cook
- Christopher Lee, actor
- Jan Leeming, television presenter and newsreader
- Rose Leslie, actress
- Joanna Lumley, actress
- Theresa May, former Prime Minister of the UK (2016–2019)
- Helen Mirren, actress
- Carey Mulligan, actress
- Laurence Olivier, actor and director
- Jeremy Paxman, broadcaster and TV presenter
- Eddie Redmayne, actor
- Jacob Rees-Mogg, former leader of the House of Commons (2019–2022)
- Brian Sewell, art critic
- Rupert Sheldrake, author and parapsychological researcher
- Maggie Smith, actress
- Patrick Stewart, actor
- Edward Stourton, broadcaster and journalist
- Margaret Thatcher, former Prime Minister of the UK (1979–1990)
- Emma Thompson, actress
- Phoebe Waller-Bridge, actress, screenwriter and producer
- Emma Watson, actress
- Justin Welby, former Archbishop of Canterbury (2013–2025)
- Rowan Williams, former Archbishop of Canterbury (2002–2012)

== See also ==
- Accent perception
- Cultivated Australian English
- English language spelling reform
- Good American Speech
- Linguistic prescription
- Queen's Latin
- Prestige (sociolinguistics)
- The King's English
- U and non-U English

== Bibliography ==
- Collins, Beverley; Mees, Inger M. (2003) [First published 1981], The Phonetics of English and Dutch (5th ed.), Leiden: Brill Publishers, ISBN 9004103406
- Collins, Beverley; Mees, Inger (2013) [First published 2003], Practical Phonetics and Phonology: A Resource Book for Students (3rd ed.), Routledge, ISBN 978-0-415-50650-2
- Cruttenden, Alan (2008), Gimson's Pronunciation of English (7th ed.), London: Hodder, ISBN 978-0340958773
- Cruttenden, Alan (2014), Gimson's Pronunciation of English (8th ed.), Routledge, ISBN 9781444183092
- Crystal, David (2003), The Cambridge Encyclopedia of the English Language (2nd ed.), Cambridge University Press, ISBN 0-521-53033-4
- Crystal, David (2005), The Stories of English, Penguin
- DuPonceau, Peter S. (1818), "English phonology; or, An essay towards an analysis and description of the component sounds of the English language.", Transactions of the American Philosophical Society, vol. 1, pp. 259–264
- Ellis, Alexander J. (1869), On early English pronunciation, New York: Greenwood Press
- Elmes, Simon (2005), Talking for Britain: A journey through the voices of our nation, Penguin, ISBN 0-14-051562-3
- Fishman, Joshua (1977), ""Standard" versus "Dialect" in Bilingual Education: An Old Problem in a New Context", The Modern Language Journal, 61 (7): 315–325, doi:10.2307/324550, JSTOR 324550
- Gimson, Alfred C. (1970), An Introduction to the pronunciation of English, London: Edward Arnold
- Gimson, Alfred C. (1980), Pronunciation of English (3rd ed.)
- Gupta, Anthea Fraser (2005), "Baths and becks" (PDF), English Today, 21 (1): 21–27, doi:10.1017/S0266078405001069, ISSN 0266-0784, S2CID 54620954
- Halle, Morris; Mohanan, K. P. (1985), "Segmental Phonology of Modern English", Linguistic Inquiry, 16 (1), The MIT Press: 57–116, JSTOR 4178420
- Hudson, Richard (1981), "Some Issues on Which Linguists Can Agree", Journal of Linguistics, 17 (2): 333–343, doi:10.1017/S0022226700007052, S2CID 144125788
- International Phonetic Association (1999), Handbook of the International Phonetic Association: A guide to the use of the International Phonetic Alphabet, Cambridge University Press, ISBN 978-0521637510
- Jenkins, Jennifer (2000), The Phonology of English as an International Language, Oxford
- Jones, Daniel (1917), English Pronouncing Dictionary (1st ed.), London: Dent
- Jones, Daniel (1926), English Pronouncing Dictionary (2nd ed.)
- Jones, Daniel (1967), An Outline of English Phonetics (9th ed.), Heffer
- Jones, Daniel (2011), Roach, Peter; Setter, Jane; Esling, John (eds.), Cambridge English Pronouncing Dictionary (18th ed.), Cambridge University Press
- de Jong, Gea; McDougall, Kirsty; Hudson, Toby; Nolan, Francis (2007), "The speaker discriminating power of sounds undergoing historical change: A formant-based study", the Proceedings of ICPhS Saarbrücken, pp. 1813–1816
- Ladefoged, Peter (2004), Vowels and Consonants, Thomson
- Lindsey, Geoff (2019), English After RP: Standard British Pronunciation Today, Palgrave Macmillan, ISBN 978-3-030-04356-8
- Lodge, Ken (2009), A Critical Introduction to Phonetics, Continuum
- McArthur, Tom (2002), The Oxford Guide to World English, Oxford University Press
- McDavid, Raven I. (1965), "American Social Dialects", College English, 26 (4): 254–260, doi:10.2307/373636, JSTOR 373636
- Mugglestone, Lynda (2003), 'Talking Proper': The Rise of Accent as Social Symbol (2nd ed.), Oxford University Press
- Newbrook, Mark (1999), "West Wirral: norms, self-reports and usage", in Foulkes, Paul; Docherty, Gerald J. (eds.), Urban Voices, pp. 90–106
- Pearce, Michael (2007), The Routledge Dictionary of English Language Studies, Routledge
- Pearsall, Judy, ed. (1999), The Concise Oxford English Dictionary (10th ed.)
- Petyt, K. M. (1985), Dialect and Accent in Industrial West Yorkshire, John Benjamins Publishing
- Ramsaran, Susan (1990), "RP: fact and fiction", Studies in the Pronunciation of English: A commemorative volume in honour of A. C. Gimson, Routledge, pp. 178–190
- Roach, Peter (2004), "British English: Received Pronunciation" (PDF), Journal of the International Phonetic Association, 34 (2): 239–245, doi:10.1017/S0025100304001768, S2CID 144338519
- Roach, Peter (2009), English Phonetics and Phonology (4th ed.), Cambridge University Press, ISBN 978-0-521-40718-2
- Roach, Peter (2011), Cambridge English Pronouncing Dictionary (18th ed.), Cambridge: Cambridge University Press, ISBN 9780521152532
- Roca, Iggy; Johnson, Wyn (1999), A Course in Phonology, Blackwell Publishing
- Rogaliński, Paweł (2011), British Accents: Cockney, RP, Estuary English, Łódź: Self published, ISBN 978-83-272-3282-3
- Schmitt, Holger (2007), "The case for the epsilon symbol (ɛ) in RP DRESS", Journal of the International Phonetic Association, 37 (3): 321–328, doi:10.1017/S0025100307003131, S2CID 143444452
- Shockey, Linda (2003), Sound Patterns of Spoken English, Blackwell
- Trudgill, Peter (1999), The Dialects of England, Blackwell
- Upton, Clive (2004), "Received Pronunciation", A Handbook of Varieties of English, Walter de Gruyter, pp. 217–230
- Upton, Clive; Kretzschmar, William A.; Konopka, Rafal (2001), Oxford Dictionary of Pronunciation for Current English, Oxford: Oxford University Press
- Wells, John C. (1970), "Local accents in England and Wales", Journal of Linguistics, 6 (2): 231–252, doi:10.1017/S0022226700002632, S2CID 143523909
- Wells, John C. (1982), Accents of English I: An Introduction, Cambridge, New York: Cambridge University Press, ISBN 0-521-29719-2
- Wells, John C. (2008), Longman Pronunciation Dictionary (3rd ed.), Longman, ISBN 9781405881180
- Wiik, K. (1965), Finnish and English Vowels, B, vol. 94, Annales Universitatis Turkensis
- Wikström, Jussi (2013), "An acoustic study of the RP English LOT and THOUGHT vowels", Journal of the International Phonetic Association, 43 (1): 37–47, doi:10.1017/S0025100312000345, S2CID 146863401
- Wise, Claude Merton (1957), Introduction to phonetics, Englewood Cliffs: Prentice-Hall, Inc.
- Wright, Joseph (1905), English Dialect Grammar
- Wyld, Henry C. K. (1927), A short history of English (3rd ed.), London: Murray
