= T-glottalization =

Pronouncing "t" as a glottal stop

In English phonology, t-glottalization (also t-glottalisation) or t-glottalling is a sound change in certain English language dialects and accents, particularly in the United Kingdom, that causes the phoneme /t/ to be pronounced as the glottal stop [ʔ] in certain positions. It is never universal, especially in careful speech, and it most often alternates with other allophones of /t/ such as [t], [tʰ], [tⁿ] (before a nasal), [tˡ] (before a lateral), or [ɾ].

As a sound change, it is a subtype of debuccalization. The pronunciation that it results in is called glottalization. Glottal reinforcement, which is quite common in English, is a stage preceding full replacement of the stop; reinforcement and replacement can also be in free variation.

== History ==
The earliest mentions of the process are in Scotland during the 19th century, when Henry Sweet commented on the phenomenon. Peter Trudgill has argued that it began in Norfolk, based on studies of rural dialects of those born in the 1870s. The Survey of English Dialects fieldworker Peter Wright found it in areas of Lancashire and said, "It is considered a lazy habit, but may have been in some dialects for hundreds of years."

Most early English dialectology focused on rural areas, so it is hard to establish how long the process has existed in urban areas. It has long been seen as a feature of Cockney dialect, and a 1955 study on Leeds dialect wrote that it occurred with "monotonous regularity" before consonants and often between vowel sounds. David Crystal claims that the sound can be heard in Received Pronunciation (RP) speakers from the early 20th century such as Daniel Jones, Bertrand Russell and Ellen Terry. The Cambridge English Pronouncing Dictionary claims that t-glottalization is now most common in London, Leeds, Edinburgh, and Glasgow.

Uniquely for English in the West Indies, Barbadian English uses a glottal allophone for /t/, and also less frequently for /k/ and /p/.

== Glottal reinforcement ==
Pre-glottalization of /t/ is found in RP and General American (GA) when the consonant /t/ occurs before another consonant, or before a pause:

- pre-consonantal: get some [ˈɡɛʔt‿ˌsʌm] lightning [ˈlaɪʔtnɪŋ] at last [əʔt‿ˈlæst]
- final (pre-pausal): wait [weɪʔt] bat [bæʔt] about [əˈbaʊʔt]

The glottal closure overlaps with the consonant that it precedes, but the articulatory movements involved can usually be observed only by using laboratory instruments. In words such as 'eaten' and 'button', pronounced with a glottal closure, it is generally almost impossible to know whether the /t/ has been pronounced (e.g. [ˈiːʔtn̩], [ˈbʌʔtn̩]) or omitted (e.g. [ˈiːʔn̩], [ˈbʌʔn̩]).

However, in the same syllable coda position, /t/ may instead be analysed as an unreleased stop.

In some accents of English, /t/ may be pre-glottalized intervocalically if it occurs finally in a stressed syllable.

There is variation in the occurrence of glottalization within RP according to which consonant follows /t/: for example, some speakers do not glottalize /t/ when /r/ follows, in words such as 'petrol' /ˈpɛtrəl/, 'mattress' /ˈmætrəs/.

T-glottalization rarely occurs syllable-initially in English but has been reported in some words that begin /tə/ in some northern dialects.

== Glottal replacement ==
In RP, and in many accents such as Cockney, it is common for /t/ to be completely replaced by a glottal stop before another consonant, as in not now [nɒʔnaʊ] and department [dɪpɑː(ɹ)ʔmənʔ]. This replacement also happens before a syllabic /n/, as in button (representable as [ˈbʌʔn̩]) and some non-rhotic pronunciations of pattern (representable as [ˈpæʔn̩]).

Among speakers of Britain, especially younger ones, glottal replacement of /t/ is frequently heard in intervocalic position before an unstressed vowel. It is most common between a stressed vowel and a reduced vowel (/ə/, /ɪ/):

- getting better [ɡɛʔɪŋ bɛʔə(ɹ)] (in GA, this is [ɡɛɾɪŋ bɛɾɚ]);
- societies [səˈsaɪəʔiz], detail [ˈdiːʔeɪl] (these are slightly less likely to be glottalized).

In both RP and GA, /t/-replacement is found in absolute final position:

- let's start [lɛʔ stɑː(ɹ)ʔ]
- what [wɒʔ] or [wɐʔ]
- foot [fʊʔ]

T-glottalization is believed to have been spreading in Southern England at a faster rate than th-fronting. Cruttenden comments that "Use of [ʔ] for /t/ word-medially intervocalically, as in water, still remains stigmatised in GB." (GB is his alternative term for RP). The increased use of glottal stops within RP is believed to be an influence from Cockney and other working-class urban speech. In a 1985 publication on the speech of West Yorkshire, KM Petyt found that t-glottalization was spreading from Bradford (where it had been reported in traditional dialect) to Halifax and Huddersfield (where it had not been reported in traditional dialect). In 1999, Shorrocks noted the phenomenon among young people in Bolton, Greater Manchester: "It is not at all typical of the traditional vernacular, in contradistinction to some other varieties of English, but younger people use [ʔ] medially between vowels more than their elders."

Recent studies (Milroy, Milroy & Walshaw 1994, Fabricius 2000) have suggested that t-glottalization is increasing in RP speech. Prince Harry frequently glottalizes his t's. One study carried out by Anne Fabricius suggests that t-glottalization is increasing in RP, the reason for this being the dialect levelling of the Southeast. She has argued that a wave-like profile of t-glottalization has been going on through the regions, which has begun with speakers in London, due to the influence of Cockney. She says that this development is due to the population size of the capital, as well as London's dominance of the Southeast of England. However, Miroslav Ježek has argued that linguists attribute changes to London too readily, and that the evidence suggests that t-glottalization began in Scotland and worked its way down gradually to London.

== North American dialects ==
American and Canadian English accents feature t-glottalization, heard in the following contexts:

- Word finally or before a syllabic /n/
  - Cat [kæʔ]
  - Latin [læʔn̩]
  - Important [ˌɪmˈpɔɹʔn̩ʔ]
- (Less commonly) across word boundaries.
  - "Right ankle" [raɪʔ‿æŋkəl]
  - "That apple" [ðæʔ‿æpəl]

Glottal replacement – or even deletion entirely in quick speech – in the coda position of a syllable is a distinctive feature of the speech of some speakers in the U.S. state of Connecticut.

T-glottalization, especially at word boundaries, is considered both a geographic and sociolinguistic phenomenon, with rates increasing both in the western U.S. and in younger female speakers. Some younger speakers pronounce syllabic /n/ as an unstressed vowel followed by n [ən~ɪn] and may pronounce the ⟨t⟩ as an alveolar tap [ɾ] instead (known as flapping).

== See also ==
- Glottalization
- Regional accents of English speakers
- Unreleased stop
- Creaky voice
