= Setter (surname) =

Setter is a surname. Notable people with the surname include:

- Jane Setter (born 1966), British phonetician
- Nava Setter (born 1949), Swiss-Israeli materials scientist
- Richard Setter (before 1390–1422), English politician
- Rick Setter (born 1937), Australian politician

== See also ==
- Sutter (surname)
