= Jack Windsor Lewis =

British phonetician (1926–2021)

- Born: 7 August 1926
- Died: 11 July 2021 (aged 94)
- Occupation: Phonetician
- Notable work: A Guide to English Pronunciation, A Concise Pronouncing Dictionary of British and American English

Jack Windsor Lewis (1926 – 11 July 2021) was a British phonetician. He is best known for his work on the phonetics of English and the teaching of English pronunciation to foreign learners. His blog postings on English phonetics and phoneticians are prolific and widely read.

== Early life ==
Windsor Lewis was born in Cardiff, and educated at local schools. After National Service, he studied at the University of Wales, Cardiff, in 1948-51, graduating with an honours degree in Medieval English. He went on to study phonetics at University College London 1954-55 & 1956-57, and obtained the Certificate of the International Phonetic Association (1st Class) in 1957.

== Career ==
=== Teaching posts ===
- Erith Technical College, Kent: Lecturer 1954–57
- Swedish Folk University at Stockholm, Trollhättan and Uddevalla: Lecturer in English 1957–58
- Mangold Institute, Madrid, Spain: Teacher of EFL Phonetics etc. 1958–59
- Dewsbury & Batley Technical etc. College, Yorkshire: Lecturer in English 1959–60
- University of Tehran, Iran: Lecturer in English 1960–63
- University of Oslo, Norway: Lecturer in English Phonetics 1963–70
- Free University, Brussels, Belgium: Phonetics Institute, Professor & Head of Department of English 1968–69
- University of Leeds: Lecturer in Phonetics in the Department of Linguistics & Phonetics, 1970–89

=== Other teaching work ===
- Tutor/Lecturer on British Council Summer Schools 1955, 1964–69, 1972 & 1979
- Tutor at Davies's Summer Schools of English Cambridge 1959–63
- Tutor/Lecturer on University of London Summer School of English 1967, 1968 & 1969
- Organiser of the Leeds University International Conferences on The Teaching of Spoken English in 1977, 79 & 81
- Director of the British Council London Summer Schools on The Teaching of Spoken English 1970, 1971, 1972, 1973, 1974 & 1975
- Lecturer on English Phonology University of London Summer School of English 1974, 1975 & 1976
- University College of Ripon & York St John Dept of English Language & Linguistics: Part-time Lecturer 1990–91
- Manchester Metropolitan University Department of Psychology & Speech Pathology: Part-time lecturer 1992
- University College London: Lecturer & Tutor on Summer Courses in English Phonetics for 21 years from 1990 every year to 2010. Gave single 'Farewell' Lecture 2011.
- University of Corunna, Spain: Honorary Director English Phonetics Course 1993
- University of Murcia, Spain: Organiser English Phonetics Summer Courses 1993–99

Jack Windsor Lewis has been a guest lecturer at over eighty other universities, at the British Institute of Recorded Sound, for the British Council and other bodies in various countries including Argentina, Austria, Belgium, Bulgaria, Chile, Croatia, the (now) Czech Republic, Denmark, Estonia, Finland, France, Germany, Hungary, Israel, Italy, Iran, Iraq, Japan, Latvia, Lithuania, the Netherlands, Norway, Peru, Poland, Romania, the (now) Slovak Republic, Slovenia, Spain, Sweden, Switzerland and Tunisia.

=== Other professional activities ===
He has acted in an advisory capacity for the BBC and ITV, for OUP, CUP and other publishers, and for West Yorkshire Playhouse and other theatres. He has worked with police forces and legal practices on many occasions 1975–86, mainly involving court appearances as "expert witness". (One notable case he was involved in was the Yorkshire Ripper manhunt). He has been an examiner at various times for the College of Speech Therapy and for the International Phonetic Association.

== Publications ==
His publications have included many articles, textbooks and A Concise Pronouncing Dictionary of British and American English. John C Wells has written of this work "in 1972, his best-known work was published: A Concise Pronouncing Dictionary of British and American English (OUP). In some countries English as a foreign language means British English, in others American: this was the first pronouncing dictionary to cover both. Like Jack's other books, it is innovative and even daring in its readiness to abandon the outdated and embrace the new."

In 1974 he recast for A. S. Hornby the treatment of pronunciation in the third edition of the Oxford Advanced Learner's Dictionary of Current English giving, for the first time in any major EFL dictionary, its (100,000) entries in American pronunciation as well as British. This lead has been widely followed and is now standard practice in dictionaries that include English pronunciation.

Other publications include:

- (1969) A Guide to English Pronunciation.
- (1974) with A. S. Hornby & A. P. Cowie Oxford Advanced Learner's Dictionary of Current English.
- (1975) Linking /r/ in the General British pronunciation of English.
- (1990) HappYland reconnoitred.
- (2014) Phonetics in Advanced Learner's Dictionaries.
