= Setter Hill =

Setter Hill may refer to the following hills:

- Setter Hill, Tingwall, on Mainland, Shetland
- Setter Hill, Whalsay, on Whalsay, Shetland
