= Setter Hill, Tingwall =

Hill in Tingwall, Shetland Islands, Scotland

Coordinates: 60.172°N 1.275°W

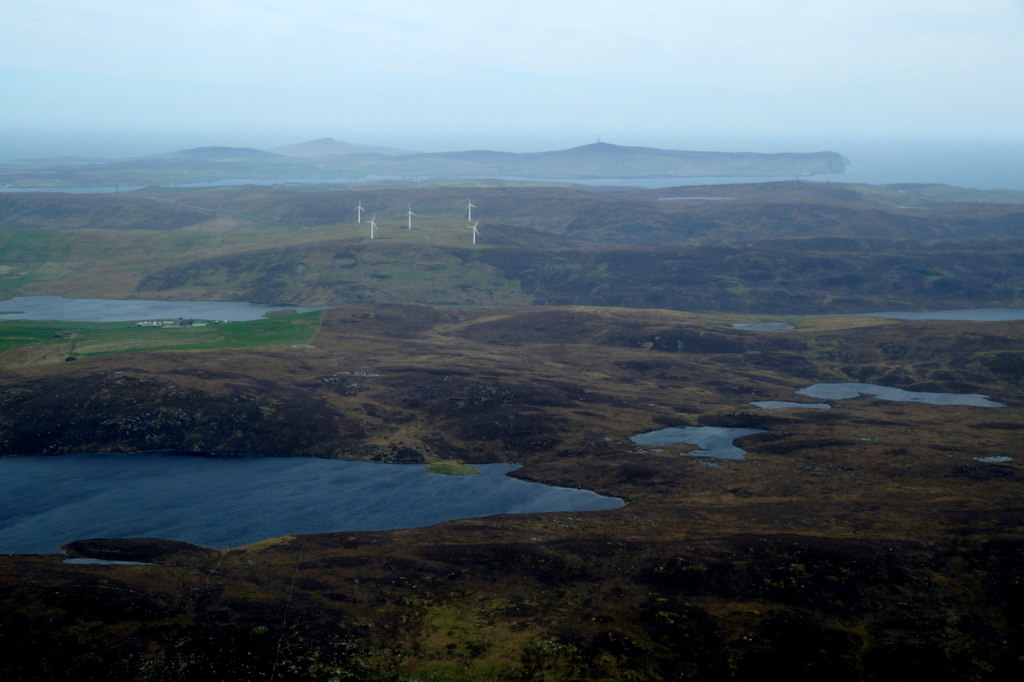

Setter Hill is a hill in Tingwall, Shetland, Scotland.
