= Consonant voicing and devoicing =

Phonetic sound change

In phonology, voicing or sonorization is a sound change where a voiceless consonant becomes voiced due to the influence of its phonological environment; a shift in the opposite direction is devoicing or surdization. Most commonly, the change is a result of sound assimilation with an adjacent sound of opposite voicing, but it can also occur word-finally or in contact with a specific vowel.

For example, the English suffix -s is pronounced [s] when it follows a voiceless phoneme (cats), and [z] when it follows a voiced phoneme (dogs). This type of assimilation is called progressive, where the second consonant assimilates to the first; regressive assimilation goes in the opposite direction, as can be seen in have to [hæftə].

== English ==
English no longer has a productive process of voicing stem-final fricatives when forming noun-verb pairs or plural nouns, but there are still examples of voicing from earlier in the history of English:

- belief ([f]) – believe ([v])
- shelf ([f]) – shelve ([v])
- grief ([f]) – grieve ([v])
- life ([f]) – live ([v])
- proof ([f]) – prove ([v])
- strife ([f]) – strive ([v])
- thief ([f]) – thieve ([v])
- bath ([θ]) - bathe ([ð])
- breath ([θ]) - breathe ([ð])
- mouth ([θ], n.) – mouth ([ð], vb.)
- sheath ([θ]) - sheathe ([ð])
- wreath ([θ]) - wreathe ([ð])
- advice ([s]) – advise ([z])
- house ([s], n.) – house ([z], vb.)
- use ([s], n.) – use ([z], vb.)

Synchronically, the assimilation at morpheme boundaries is still productive, such as in:

- cat + s → cats
- dog + s → dogs ([ɡz])
- miss + ed → missed ([st])
- whizz + ed → whizzed ([zd])

The voicing alternation found in plural formation is losing ground in the modern language. Of the alternations listed below many speakers retain only the [f ~ v] pattern, which is supported by the orthography. This voicing of /f/ is a relic of Old English, at a time when the unvoiced consonants between voiced vowels were 'colored' by an allophonic voicing (lenition) rule /f/ → [v]. As the language became more analytic and less inflectional, final vowels or syllables stopped being pronounced. For example, modern knives is a one syllable word instead of a two syllable word, with the vowel e not pronounced and no longer part of the word's structure. The voicing alternation between [f] and [v] occurs now as realizations of separate phonemes /f/ and /v/. The alternation pattern is well maintained for the items listed immediately below, but its loss as a productive allophonic rule permits its abandonment for new usages of even well-established terms: while leaf~leaves in reference to 'outgrowth of plant stem' remains vigorous, the Toronto ice hockey team is uncontroversially named the Maple Leafs.

- knife – knives
- leaf – leaves
- wife – wives
- wolf – wolves

The following mutations are optional:

- bath ([θ]) - baths ([ð])
- mouth ([θ]) - mouths ([ð])
- oath ([θ]) - oaths ([ð])
- path ([θ]) - paths ([ð])
- youth ([θ]) - youths ([ð])
- house ([s]) – houses ([z])

Sonorants (/l r w j/) following aspirated fortis plosives (that is, /p t k/ in the onsets of stressed syllables unless preceded by /s/) are devoiced such as in please, crack, twin, and pewter.

Several varieties of English have a productive synchronic rule of /t/-voicing whereby intervocalic /t/ not followed by a stressed vowel is realized as voiced alveolar flap [ɾ], as in tutor, with the first /t/ pronounced as voiceless aspirated [tʰ] and the second as voiced [ɾ]. Voiced phoneme /d/ can also emerge as [ɾ], so that tutor and Tudor may be homophones, both with [ɾ] (the voiceless identity of word-internal /t/ in tutor is manifested in tutorial, where stress shift assures [tʰ]).

== In other languages ==
=== Voicing assimilation ===
In many languages, including Polish and Russian, there is anticipatory assimilation of unvoiced obstruents immediately before voiced obstruents. For example, Russian просьба 'request' is pronounced /ˈprozʲbə/ (instead of */ˈprosʲbə/) and Polish prośba 'request' is pronounced /ˈprɔʑba/ (instead of */ˈprɔɕba/). The process can cross word boundaries as well: Russian дочь бы /ˈdod͡ʑ bɨ/ 'daughter would'. The opposite type of anticipatory assimilation happens to voiced obstruents before unvoiced ones: обсыпать /ɐpˈs̪ɨpətʲ/.

In Italian, /s/ before a voiced consonant is pronounced [z] within any phonological word: sbaglio [ˈzbaʎʎo] 'mistake', slitta [ˈzlitta] 'sled', snello [ˈznɛllo] 'slender'. The rule applies across morpheme boundaries (disdire [dizˈdiːre] 'cancel') and word boundaries (lapis nero [ˌlaːpizˈneːro] 'black pencil'). This voicing is productive and so it applies also to borrowings, not only to native lexicon: snob [znɔb].

=== Final devoicing ===
Final devoicing is a systematic phonological process occurring in languages such as German, Dutch, Polish, Russian and Catalan. Such languages have voiced obstruents in the syllable coda or at the end of a word become voiceless.

=== Initial voicing ===
Initial voicing is a process of historical sound change in which voiceless consonants become voiced at the beginning of a word. For example, modern German sagen [ˈzaːɡn̩], Yiddish זאָגן [ˈzɔɡn̩], and Dutch zeggen [ˈzɛɣə] (all "say") all begin with [z], which derives from [s] in an earlier stage of Germanic, as is still attested in English say, Swedish säga [ˈsɛjːa], and Icelandic segja [ˈseiːja]. Some English dialects were affected as well, but it is rare in Modern English. One example is fox (with the original consonant) compared to vixen (with a voiced consonant).
