= K. M. Petyt =

Sociolinguist

Keith Malcolm Petyt (/ˈpɛtɪt/; born February 1941) is a sociolinguist.

As a native of Bradford, he investigated the speech of West Yorkshire in his early work. His first publication, Emily Brontë and the Haworth Dialect, compared the speech of the servant Joseph in Wuthering Heights with information on the Haworth dialect from two informants, and concluded that Emily Brontë had been accurate with her depictions.

He was one of the first to apply Labovian methods in Britain with his research in 1970–1 on the speech of Bradford, Halifax and Huddersfield. He concluded that the speech detailed in most of dialectology (e.g. A. J. Ellis, the Survey of English Dialects) had virtually disappeared, having found only one speaker out of his sample of 106 speakers who regularly used dialect. However, he found that differences in speech persisted as an indicator of social class, age and gender. This PhD dissertation was later adapted into a book, Dialect and Accent in Industrial West Yorkshire. The work was criticised by Graham Shorrocks on the grounds that the sociolinguistic methods used were inappropriate for recording the traditional vernacular and that there was an inadequate basis for comparison with earlier dialect studies in West Yorkshire. In a review in Language in Society, Joan Beal methodologically critiqued Petyt's decision to categorise the social class of women according to their husband's occupation.

His 1980 book The study of dialect: an introduction to dialectology was a critical history of dialect studies. He also wrote a review of the very successful textbook Accents of English by John C. Wells, which was generally positive but criticised the uneven coverage and the inconsistent attitude to the Survey of English Dialects. In Spring 1982, he was a co-presenter of the BBC Radio 4 series Locally Speaking.

Having spent most of his career lecturing at and working at the University of Reading, he edited the multi-author book The Growth of Reading in 1993.

He retired to the Yorkshire Dales and wrote a review of dialect studies in the Sedbergh area in 2014, which he donated to both the Sedbergh and District History Society and the Yorkshire Dialect Society. He is currently the Yorkshire Dales National Park's Member Champion for Recreation Management and is a vice president and former chairman of the Yorkshire Dales Society.
