= Jane Setter =

British linguist

- Born: 18 July 1966 (age 60); Eastbourne, Sussex, England
- Occupation: Phonetician
- Notable work: English Pronouncing Dictionary, eds. 15–18; Hong Kong English
- Awards: National Teaching Fellowship
- Website: www.reading.ac.uk/en/elal/staff/professor-jane-setter

Jane Setter (born 18 July 1966 in Eastbourne) is a British phonetician. She teaches at the University of Reading, where she is Professor of Phonetics. She is best known for work on the pronunciation of British and Hong Kong English, and on speech prosody in atypical populations.

== Education ==
Jane Setter attended Dane Court Grammar School, Broadstairs, Kent, before taking Language Studies and English at the College of Ripon and York St John (then part of the University of Leeds). She then completed an MA in Linguistics and English Language Teaching at the University of Leeds in 1992, and a PhD at the University of Reading (while working in Hong Kong), which she was awarded in 2001.

== Career ==
From 1989 to 1991, she was an English language tutor at the private ACC English Language School in Japan. On completing her MA, she took up a number of part-time positions at the University of Leeds, Leeds Metropolitan University (now Leeds Beckett University) and the University of Reading before being appointed as a full-time Assistant Professor at the Hong Kong Polytechnic University, where she worked from 1995 to 2001. After several part-time lecturing positions at University College, London, City, University of London and the University of Reading, she was appointed full-time as lecturer in Phonetics at the University of Reading in 2004, subsequently gaining promotion to Senior Lecturer, Associate Professor and, in 2013, Professor of Phonetics. She was Head of English Language and Applied Linguistics at Reading University from 2009 to 2015.

== Writing and research ==
She is notable for her work as co-editor of the Cambridge English Pronouncing Dictionary for the editions from the 16th (2003) to the current 18th (2011); for the 15th edition (1997), she is listed as Pronunciation Associate. She is the lead author on the co-authored Hong Kong English, of which one reviewer wrote "this book has achieved its goal of providing an overview of Hong Kong English as an emergent variety of English to general readers", and Speech Prosody in Atypical Populations, co-edited with long-term research collaborator Vesna Stojanovik. A review of this book said "Overall, this edited volume fills a clear void in the literature in the area of atypical prosody”. She has published a large number of research papers and is a popular invited speaker on the international conference circuit, appearing in, among other countries, Korea, Japan, Spain, Ukraine, the US and France.

Setter was a Plenary Speaker at the 2017 conference of the International Association of Teaching English Overseas (IATEFL), the first phonetician to be invited to do this in the Association's fifty-year history. She makes regular media appearances on television and radio shows nationally and internationally, and also in the press, commenting mainly on issues related to British and overseas accents of English, accent prejudice and the way people speak. Setter has held a number of grants, mainly for research related to aspects of speech prosody (e.g. intonation, rhythm and stress) in Global Englishes, such as Hong Kong and Malaysian English, and among children with Williams and Down's syndrome. Her book Your Voice Speaks Volumes was published by Oxford University Press in November 2019, appearing in paperback in July 2021.

== Selected publications ==
=== Books ===
- Roach, P., Esling, J. and Setter, J. (2011) (original editor Daniel Jones) The Cambridge English Pronouncing Dictionary, 18th Edition, Cambridge University Press, ISBN 978-0-521-15255-6
- Setter, Jane, Wong, Cathy S. P and Chan, Brian H. S. (2010). Hong Kong English, Edinburgh University Press ISBN 978-0-7486-3596-2
- Setter, Jane (2021), Your Voice Speaks Volumes: it's not what you say but how you say it (paperback edition), Oxford University Press, ISBN 978-0192843029
- Stojanovik, V. and Setter, J. (eds.) (2011) Speech Prosody in Atypical Populations: Assessment and Remediation, J&R Press, ISBN 978-1-9078-2600-9
- Yap, N. T. and Setter, J. (eds.) (2020) Speech Research in a Malaysian Context, Universiti Putra Malaysia Press ISBN 978-9672395256

=== Papers ===
- Mat Nayan, N. and Setter, J. (2016) 'Malay English intonation: the cooperative rise', English World-Wide, Vol. 37.3, pp. 293–322.
- Sebina, B., Setter, J. and Daller, M. (2020) 'The Setswana speech rhythm of 6–7 years old Setswana-English bilingual children', International Journal of Bilingualism, Vol. 25.3, pp. 592–605.
- Setter, J. (2005) 'Communicative patterns of intonation in L2 English teaching and learning', in K. Dziubalska-Kolaczyk and J. Przedlacka (eds) English pronunciation models: a changing scene, Peter Lang, Bern, pp. 367–389.
- Setter, J. (2006) 'Speech rhythm in world Englishes: the case of Hong Kong', TESOL Quarterly, Vo. 40.4, pp. 763–782.
- Setter, J. (2008) 'Consonant clusters in Hong Kong English', World Englishes, Vol. 27.3-4, pp. 502–515.
- Setter, J. and Jenkins, J. (2005) 'Pronunciation: State-of-the-art review article', Language Teaching, Vol. 38.1, pp. 1–17.
- Setter, J., Mok, P., Low, E. L., Zuo, D. and Ao, R. (2014) 'Word juncture characteristics in world Englishes: a research report', World Englishes, Vol. 33.2, pp. 278–291.
- Setter, J. E., Stojanovik, V. and Martínez-Castilla, P. (2010) 'Evaluating the intonation of non-native speakers of English using a computerised test battery', International Journal of Applied Linguistics, Vol. 20.3, pp. 368–385.
- Setter, J., Stojanovik, V., van Ewijk, L. and Moreland, M. (2007) 'Affective prosody in children with Williams syndrome', Clinical Linguistics & Phonetics, Vol. 21.9, pp. 659–672.
- Stojanovik, V. and Setter, J. E. (2009) 'Conditions in which prosodic impairments occur', International Journal of Speech-Language Pathology, Vol. 11.4, pp. 293–297.
- Stojanovik, V., Setter, J. and Lacroix, A. (2016) 'Le développement de la prosodie dans le syndrome de Williams et le syndrome de Down chez des enfants de langue anglaise', Bulletin de psychologie, Vol. 69.2, pp. 137–145.
- Stojanovik, V., Zimmerer, V., Setter, J., Hudson, K., Poyraz-Bilgin, I. and Saddy, D. (2018) 'Artificial grammar learning in Williams syndrome and in typical development: the role of rules, familiarity and prosodic cues', Applied Psycholinguistics, Vol. 39.2, pp. 327–353.
