= John C. Wells =

British phonetician (born 1939)

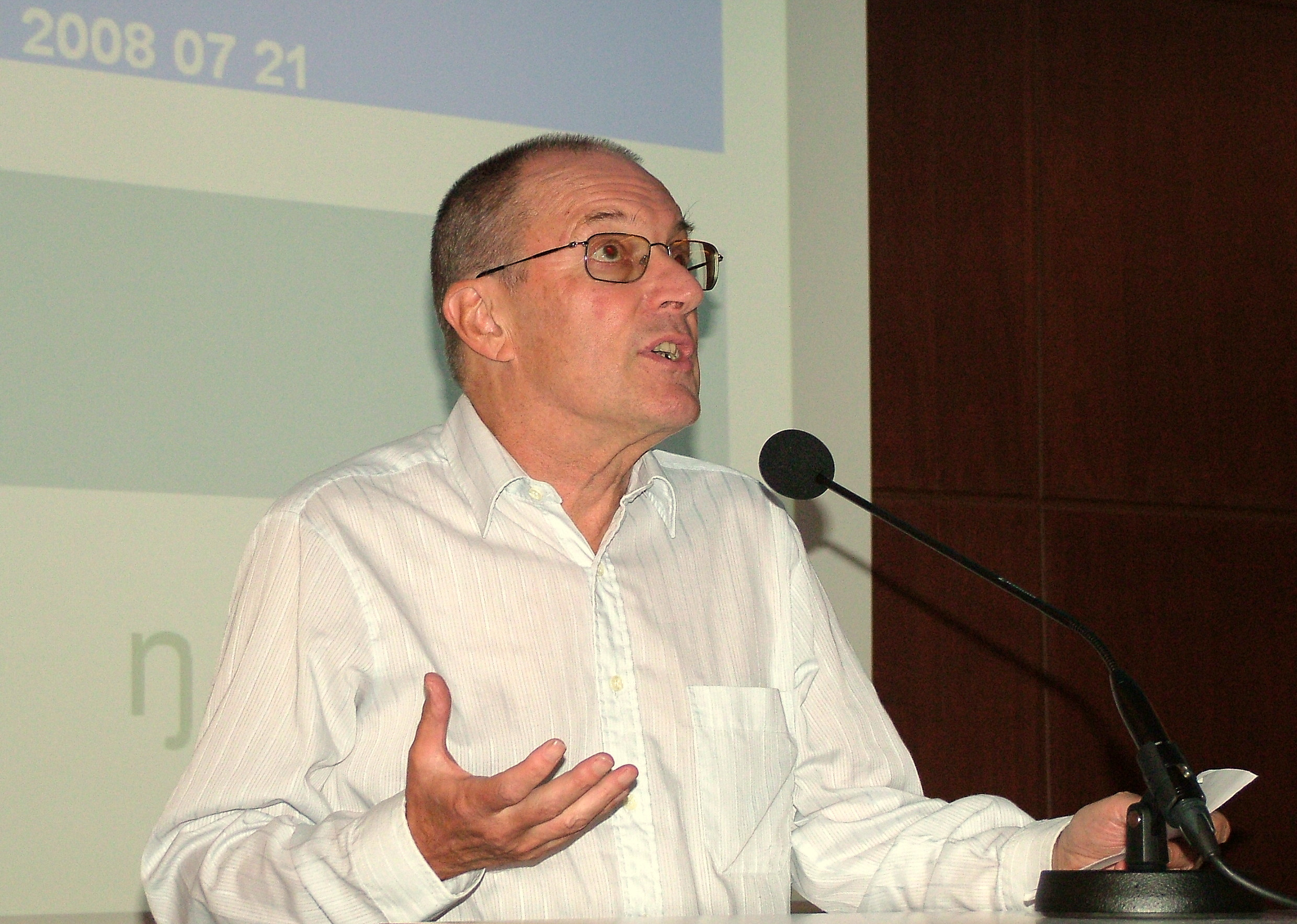
- Wells in 2008
- Born: John Christopher Wells; 11 March 1939 (age 87); Bootle, Lancashire, England
- Partner: Gabriel Parsons (died 2023)

Academic background
- Education: Trinity College, Cambridge (BA); University of London (MA, PhD)
- Thesis: Phonological Adaptation in the Speech of Jamaicans in the London Area (1971)
- Doctoral advisor: Joseph Desmond O'Connor

Academic work
- Discipline: Phonetician
- Institutions: University College London (1962–2006)

John Christopher Wells (born 11 March 1939) is a British phonetician and Esperantist. Wells is a professor emeritus at University College London, where until his retirement in 2006 he held the departmental chair in phonetics. He is known for his work on the Esperanto language and his invention of the standard lexical sets and the X-SAMPA encoding of the IPA.

== Early life ==
Wells was born on 11 March 1939 in Bootle, Lancashire.

Wells earned his bachelor's degree at Trinity College, Cambridge, and his master's degree and his PhD at the University of London.

== Career ==
Wells is known for his book and cassette Accents of English, the book and CD The Sounds of the IPA, Lingvistikaj Aspektoj de Esperanto, and the Longman Pronunciation Dictionary. He is the author of the most widely used English–Esperanto dictionary.

Until his retirement, Wells directed a two-week summer course in phonetics for University College London, focusing on practical and theoretical phonetics, as well as aspects of teaching phonetics. The course ends with written and oral examinations, for which the IPA Certificate of Proficiency in the Phonetics of English is awarded.

From 2003 to 2007 he was president of the International Phonetic Association. He is also a member of the six-man Academic Advisory Committee at Linguaphone.

Wells has long been a pioneer of new technology. He is the inventor of the X-SAMPA ASCII phonetic alphabet for use in digital computers that could not handle IPA symbols. He learned HTML during the mid-1990s, and he created a Web page that compiled media references to Estuary English, although he was sceptical of the concept. After retirement, Wells ran a regular blog on phonetic topics from March 2006 to April 2013. He announced the end of his blog on 22 April 2013 saying, "if I have nothing new to say, then the best plan is to stop talking."

=== Work on accents of English ===
A considerable part of Wells's research focuses on the phonetic description of varieties of English. In 1982, Cambridge University Press published his three volumes of Accents of English that described accents all over the English-speaking world in phonetic terminology. This applied consistent terminology to accents that had previously been analysed in isolation. Accents of English defined the concept of lexical sets, a concept in wide usage. A lexical set is a set of words (named with a designated element) that share a special characteristic. For example, words belonging to lexical set BATH have the /æ/ phoneme in the United States and /ɑː/ phoneme in Received Pronunciation. In addition, Wells is acknowledged as the source of the term rhotic to describe accents where the letter r in spelling is always pronounced phonetically.

Before writing Accents of English, Wells had written two very critical reviews of the Linguistic Atlas of England, which was the principal output of the Survey of English Dialects. He argued that the methodology was outdated, that the sample was not representative of the population and that it was not possible to "discover with any certainty the synchronic vowel-system in each of the localities investigated". KM Petyt noted in his review of Accents of English that Wells had made abundant use of the data from the Survey of English Dialects in some sections of the work whilst criticising the survey in other parts of the same work.

Wells was part of the committee of the Atlas Linguarum Europae for England and Wales, but never played a large role.

=== Longman Pronunciation Dictionary ===
Wells was appointed by Longman to write its pronunciation dictionary, the first edition of which was published in 1990. There had not been a pronunciation dictionary published in the United Kingdom since 1977, when Alfred C. Gimson published his last (the 14th) edition of English Pronouncing Dictionary. The book by Wells had a much greater scope, including American pronunciations as well as RP pronunciations and including non-RP pronunciations widespread in Great Britain (such as use of a short vowel in the words bath, chance, last, etc. and of a long vowel in book, look, etc.). His book also included transcriptions of foreign words in their native languages and local pronunciations of place names in the English-speaking world.

=== Esperanto ===
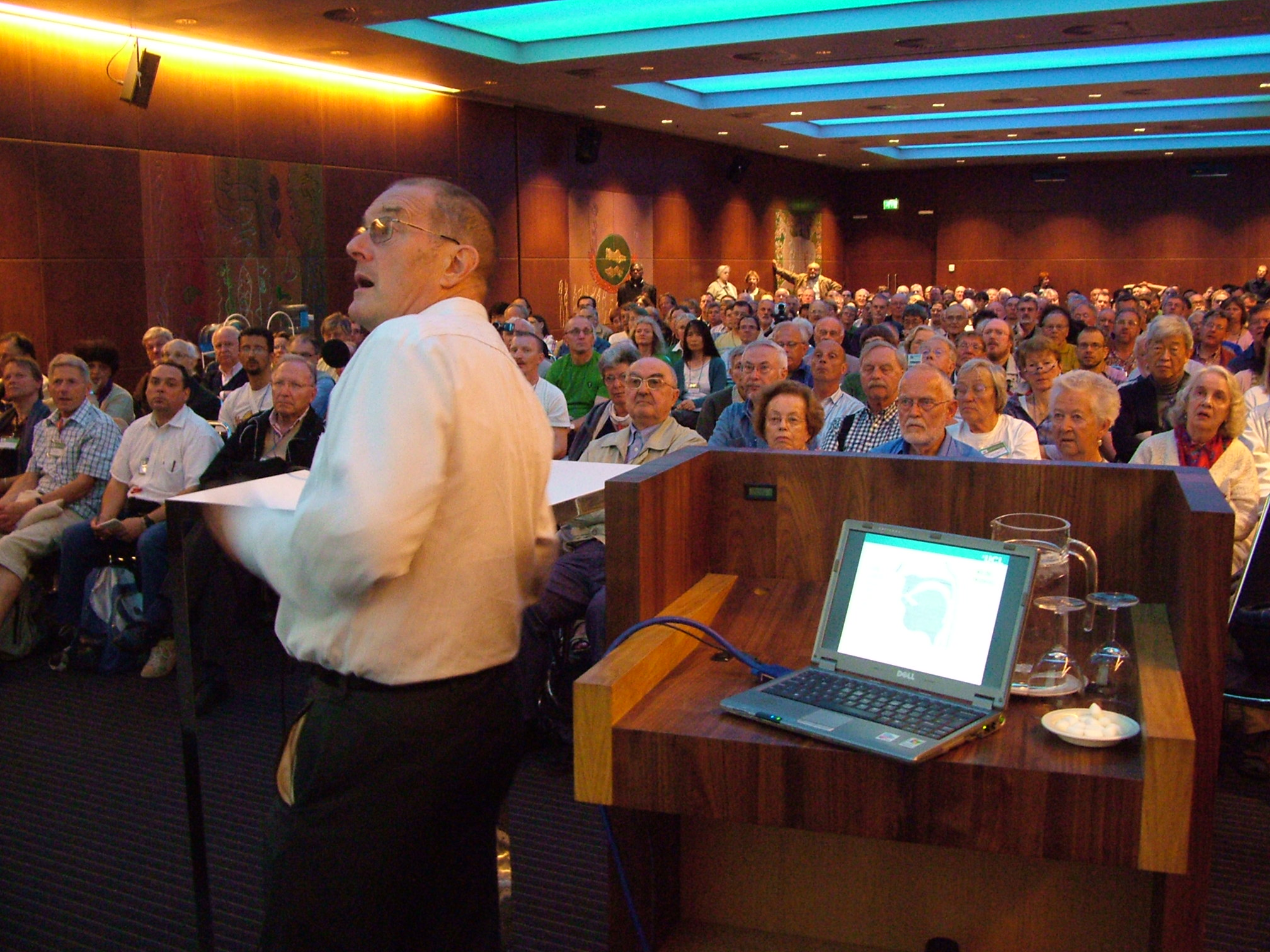
John Wells at the World Congress of Esperanto, Rotterdam 2008

Wells was the president of the World Esperanto Association (UEA) from 1989 to 1995. He has also been the president of the Esperanto Academy (2007–2013) and the Esperanto Association of Britain (2011–2013).

=== Work for spelling reform ===
Wells was president of the Spelling Society, which advocates spelling reform, from 2003 to 2013. In 2008, he was criticised in a speech by then-Leader of the Opposition David Cameron, who referred to him only as "President of the Spelling Society", for advocating tolerance of text spelling.

== Personal life ==
His father was originally from South Africa, and his mother was English; he has two younger brothers. Wells grew up in Up Holland, Lancashire, born to the vicar of the parish, Philip Wells. He has commented on the accent of the area and how it contrasted with the Received Pronunciation that was spoken in his home in his book Accents of English; vol. 2: the British Isles.

He attended St John's School, Leatherhead, studied languages and taught himself Gregg shorthand. Having learned Welsh, he was interviewed in Welsh on radio; according to his CV, he has a reasonable knowledge of ten languages. He was apparently approached by the Home Office to work on speaker identification but turned down the offer as it was still considered unacceptable to be gay at the time, and he feared that the security check would make his sexual orientation public. In September 2006 he signed a civil partnership with Gabriel Parsons, a native of Montserrat and his partner since 1968. Parsons died on 16 November 2023.

=== Music ===
Wells is a member of London Gay Men's Chorus and was featured in their It Gets Better video. He is also a player of the melodeon and has uploaded videos of his playing to YouTube.

== Works ==
=== Essays ===
- 1962 – ə spesəmin əv britiʃ iŋgliʃ [A specimen of British English]. In: Maître Phonétique Nr. 117, S. 2–5. JSTOR 44705582
- 1967 – spesimɛn. *dʒəmeikən ˈkriːoul [Specimen. Jamaican Creole]. In: Maître Phonétique, Nr. 127 S. 5. JSTOR 44705724
- 1968 – Nonprevocalic intrusive r in urban Hampshire. IN: Progress Report, UCL Phonetics Laboratory, S. 56–57
- 1970 – Local accents in England and Wales. In: J.Ling., Nr. 6, S. 231–252.
- 1979 – Final voicing and vowel length in Welsh. In: Phonetica. 36.4–5, S. 344–360.
- 1980 – The brogue that isn't. In: JIPA vol. 10 (1980), S. 74–79. Can be read online.
- 1985 – English accents in England. In: P. Trudgill (Hrsg.): Language in the British Isles. Cambridge University Press. 55–69.
- 1985 – English pronunciation and its dictionary representation. In: R. Ilson: (Hrsg.): Dictionaries, lexicography and language learning. Oxford: Pergamon.
- 1994 – The Cockneyfication of RP?. In: G. Melchers u.a. (Hrsg.): Nonstandard Varieties of Language. Papers from the Stockholm Symposium 11–13 April 1991. 198–205. Stockholm Studies in English LXXXIV. Stockholm: Almqvist & Wiksell International.
- 1995 – New syllabic consonants in English. In: J. Windsor Lewis (Hrsg.): Studies in General and English Phonetics. Essays in honour of Prof. J.D. O'Connor. London: Routledge. ISBN 0-415-08068-1.
- 1995 – Age grading in English pronunciation preferences. In: Proceedings of ICPhS 95, Stockholm, vol. 3:696–699.
- 1996 – Why phonetic transcription is important. In: Malsori (Journal of the Phonetic Society of Korea) 31–32, S. 239–242.
- 1997 – What's happening to Received Pronunciation?. In: English Phonetics (English Phonetic Society of Japan), 1, S. 13–23.
- 1997 – Our changing pronunciation. In: Transactions of the Yorkshire Dialect Society xix, S. 42–48
- 1997 – One of three named "main technical authors" for Part IV, Spoken language reference materials. In: D. Gibbon u.a. (Hrsg.): Handbook of Standards and Resources for Spoken Language Systems. Berlin: Mouton de Gruyter, 1997.
- 1997 – Whatever happened to Received Pronunciation? In: Medina & Soto (Hrsg): II Jornadas de Estudios Ingleses, Universidad de Jaén, Spain, S. 19–28.
- 1997 – Is RP turning into Cockney?. In: M. P. Dvorzhetska, A. A. Kalita (Hrsg.): Studies in Communicative Phonetics and Foreign Language Teaching Methodology. Kyiv State Linguistic University, Ukraine, S. 10–15.
- 1999 – Which pronunciation do you prefer?. In: IATEFL Bd. 149, June–July 1999, "The Changing Language", S. 10–11.
- 1999 – Pronunciation preferences in British English. A new survey. In: Proc. of the 14th International Congress of Phonetic Sciences, San Francisco, 1999.
- 2000 – British English pronunciation preferences. A changing scene. In: Journal of the International Phonetic Association (1999) 29 (1), S. 33–50.
- 2000 – Overcoming phonetic interference. In: English Phonetics (Journal of the English Phonetic Society of Japan), Nr. 3, S. 9–21.
- 2001 – Orthographic diacritics. In: Language Problems and Language Planning 24.3.
- 2002 – John Wells. In: K. Brown, V. Law (Hrsg.): Linguistics in Britain. Personal histories. Publications of the Philological Society, 36. Oxford: Blackwell.
- 2002 – Accents in Britain today. In: Ewa Waniek-Klimczak, Patrick J. Melia (Hrsg.): Accents and Speech in Teaching English Phonetics and Phonology. Lang, Frankfurt/M. 2002 [2003]. ISBN 3-631-39616-3, S. 9–17.
- 2003 – Phonetic research by written questionnaire. In: M. J. Solé, u.a. (Hrsg.): Proc. 15th Int. Congress of Phonetic Sciences, Barcelona, R.4.7:4
- 2003 – Phonetic symbols in word processing and on the web. In: M. J. Solé u.a. (Hrsg..): Proc. 15th Int. Congress of Phonetic Sciences, Barcelona, S.2.8:6

=== Monographs ===
- 1962 – A study of the formants of the pure vowels of British English. Unpublished MA thesis, University of London.
- 1971 – Practical Phonetics. London: Pitman. ISBN 0-273-43949-9 (with G. Colson)
- 1973 – Jamaican pronunciation in London. Publications of the Philological Society xxv. Oxford: Blackwell. ISBN 0-631-14730-6. (Revised version of his PhD dissertation, 1971.)
- 1990 – Longman Pronunciation Dictionary. Longman. (ESU Duke of Edinburgh's Prize.)
- 1993 – Hutchinson Dictionary of Difficult Words. Edited by John Ayto. Oxford: Helicon.
- 1994 – Longman Interactive English Dictionary. CD-ROM, incorporating a spoken version of the Longman Pronunciation Dictionary. ACT Multimedia/ Harlow: Longman, ISBN 0-582-23694-0.

=== Books ===
- Wells, J. C. (1969). Concise Esperanto and English Dictionary. Kent: Teach Yourself Books. ISBN 0-340-27576-6.
- Wells, J. C. (1982). Accents of English (Three volumes + cassette). New York: Cambridge University Press. ISBN 0-521-22919-7. Vol. 1: an Introduction; vol. 2: the British Isles; vol. 3: Beyond the British Isles
- Wells, J. C. (1985). Geiriadur Esperanto / Kimra Vortaro. London: Grŵp Pump/Group Five. ISBN 0-906632-02-1.
- Wells, J. C. (2000). Longman Pronunciation Dictionary. Harlow, England: Pearson Education Ltd. ISBN 058236468X. (casebound), 0582364671 (paperback edition).
- Wells, J. C. (2006). English Intonation: an Introduction. Cambridge: Cambridge University Press. ISBN 0-521-68380-7.
- Wells, J. C. (2014). Sounds Interesting: Observations on English and General Phonetics. Cambridge: Cambridge University Press.
- Wells, J. C. (2016). Sounds Fascinating: Further Observations on English Phonetics and Phonology. Cambridge: Cambridge University Press.
