= Norfolk dialect =

English dialect spoken in Norfolk county, England

- Broad Norfolk
- Region: Norfolk, England, United Kingdom
- Ethnicity: English people
- Language family: Indo-European: Germanic; West Germanic; Ingvaeonic; Anglo-Frisian; Anglic; English; Southern English; East Anglian English; Norfolk dialect
- Writing system: English alphabet

Language codes
- ISO 639-3: –
- IETF: en-u-sd-gbnfk
- Location of Norfolk within the UK.

The Norfolk dialect, often specifically the Norwich dialect, is a variety of East Anglian English spoken in the county of Norfolk in England.

== Features ==
=== Vowels ===
In addition the East Anglian English features, one specific accent is associated with urban Norfolk and namely its largest city, Norwich:

- Norfolk smoothing results in a pronunciation of two or three vowel syllables with a single long vowel; for example, 'player' is [plæː] rather than /pleɪ.ə/. Where the suffix '-ing' is preceded by a vowel or diphthong, there is a smoothing effect that results in a single vowel. Thus 'go+ing' is usually pronounced as a single syllable [ɡɔːn] rather than as a two-syllable word ending in /ən/, and 'doing' is [dɜːn] rather than /duː.ɪŋ/. This phenomenon is the only one in East Anglia that is spreading, in the 21st century, from north to south (the opposite direction from the typical south-to-north influences coming out of London).
- The toe–tow merger typical of most Modern English dialects may continue to be resisted, in Norfolk even more than in the rest of East Anglia. The GOAT vowel /əʊ/ of the British standard Received Pronunciation (RP) has a quality that can be represented in Norfolk as [ʊu~uː]: thus words with the spelling 'oa', 'oe' and 'oCe' such as 'boat', 'toe', 'load' may sound to outsiders like 'boot', 'too', 'lood' respectively. An exception is that of words spelt with 'ou', 'ow', 'ol' such as 'soul', 'know', 'told' which have a wider diphthong quite similar to the RP [əʊ], or even wider [ʌu]. However, the merger is gradually expanding into Norfolk as of the beginning of the 21st century.
- The pane–pain merger typical of most Modern English dialects may continue to be resisted. Older Norwich residents and in rural East Anglia, divide the FACE phoneme into /eɪ/, is [æɪ] in words spelt with 'ai' or 'ay' such as 'rain' and 'day', but [eː] or [ɛː] (similar to 'air') in words spelt 'aCe' such as 'take', 'late'. This has largely given way throughout most of East Anglia to a merger towards [æɪ].
- Words containing /aʊ/ sounds (as in MOUTH) can be more fronted or raised compared against most other English dialects: often, [æʉ] or [ɛʉ].
- Whereas RP has the rounded LOT vowel /ɒ/ in words containing the spellings 'f', 'ff', 'gh' or 'th' (such as 'often', 'off', 'cough', 'trough' and 'cloth'), Norfolk may have /ɔː/ as in the vowel of THOUGHT. This is a manifestation of the lot-cloth split.
- The vowel /ɒ/ of LOT is traditionally realised as an unrounded vowel [ɑ]. However, the rounded RP variant is encroaching even in urban Norwich.
- The near-square merger variably occurs, particularly among the working class, so that the NEAR and SQUARE vowels /ɪə/ and /eə/ sound the same in Norwich. Thus 'beer' and 'bear' sound the same, the vowel quality being [ɛː]. The phonetic output may be considered to be related to the smoothing described above.

=== Consonants ===
- In older Norfolk dialect the spelling 'thr' could be pronounced as /tr/ and the spelling 'shr' as /sr/; thus 'three' sounds the same as 'tree' and 'shriek' is pronounced as /sriːk/.

=== Grammar ===
- The word that usually denotes it when it is the subject of the clause, so that "it is" becomes "that is" and "it smells funny" becomes "that smell funny". This does not imply emphatic usage as it would in Standard English and indeed sentences such as "When that rain, we get wet", are entirely feasible in the dialect. ("It's a nice day today" is often "That's a nice day today".)
- Some verbs conjugate differently in Norfolk or Suffolk. The past tense of 'show', for example is 'shew', and of the verb to snow, 'snew', swam becomes 'swum'. The past of drive is 'driv'. e.g. 'I driv all the way to Yarmouth, and on the way back that snew.' 'Sang' is always 'sung' ('She sung out of tune'), and 'stank' is always 'stunk' ('After they had mucked out the pigs their clothes stunk'). Many verbs simply have no past tense, and use the present form. e.g. 'Come', 'say' and 'give'. 'When my husband come home, he say he give tuppence for a loaf of bread' meaning 'When he came home, he said, he gave tuppence...'. This even applies to a verb like 'go'. 'Every time they go get the needle out, it moved'. Verbs whose past participles differ from their active past tenses e.g. 'spoken', are mostly ignored in Norfolk. e.g. 'If you were clever you were spoke to more often by the teacher', or 'If I hadn't went up to Mousehold that night'.
- The verb 'to be' conjugates variously in the negative. 'I'm not' can be 'I en't' or 'I in't', or often 'I aren't'. 'He/she isn't' is usually 'he en't'. 'We/you/they are not' is as elsewhere 'we/you/they aren't'. Ethel George says 'I in't going out no more'. It could be that 'I in't' is the Norwich form of the Norfolk 'I en't'.
- The relative pronouns, 'who', 'which' and 'that' are mostly replaced with 'what' in Norfolk. e.g. 'That was the one what I was talking about' or 'He was shaking Pimper Wiley...what lived a few doors from us'. Adjectival use of 'those' usually becomes 'them', e.g. 'I was as bad as them what done it'.
- The present participle, or ...ing, form of the verb, such as running, writing etc. is mostly rendered in the Middle English form of 'a-running', 'a-jumping' etc. 'She's a robbing me'.

=== Vocabulary ===
- abed (in bed)
- bor – neighbour (or friend)
- cor blarst me ("god blast me", when expressing, shock, surprise or exasperation)
- craze (nag. e.g.he kept crazing me to buy him sweets, or 'I'd craze her and craze her her')
- dew yew keep a throshin (means "carry on with the threshing" on its own but also means goodbye or "take care of yourself")
- dickey (donkey; however note that the word 'donkey' appears only to have been in use in English since the late 18th century. The Oxford English Dictionary quotes 'dicky' as one of the alternative slang terms for an ass.)
- directly ("as soon as" or "immediately"), as in "Directly they got their money on Friday nights, the women would get the suits out of the pawn shop"
- dudder (shiver or tremble. It is not unique to Norfolk. Appears in the OED as 'dodder'.)
- finish, at the/in the (eventually, as in "he gave it to her at the finish"; or "You might as well have went in the beginning, 'cause you had to go in the finish".)
- get on to someone (to tell someone off, as in "They all went quiet, but they never got onto father no more")
- guzunder (chamber pot. Derived from "goes-under")

== Portrayal ==
The treatment of the Norfolk dialect in the television drama All the King's Men in 1999 in part prompted the foundation of the Friends of Norfolk Dialect (FOND), a group formed with the aim of preserving and promoting Broad Norfolk.

Arnold Wesker's 1958 play Roots used Norfolk dialect.

During the 1960s, Anglia Television produced a soap opera called "Weavers Green" which used local characters making extensive use of Norfolk dialect. The programme was filmed at the "cul-de-sac" village of Heydon north of Reepham in mid Norfolk.

An example of the Norfolk accent and vocabulary can be heard in the songs by Allan Smethurst, aka The Singing Postman. Smethurst's Norfolk accent is well known from his releases of the 1960s, such as "Hev Yew Gotta Loight Bor?". The Boy John Letters of Sidney Grapes, which were originally published in the Eastern Daily Press, are another valid example of the Norfolk dialect. Beyond simply portrayers of speech and idiom however, Smethurst, and more especially Grapes, record their authentic understanding of mid-20th century Norfolk village life. Grapes' characters, the Boy John, Aunt Agatha, Granfar, and Ole Missus W, perform a literary operetta celebrating down-to-earth ordinariness over bourgeois affectation and pretence.

Charles Dickens had some grasp of the Norfolk accent which he utilised in the speech of the Yarmouth fishermen, Ham and Daniel Peggoty in David Copperfield. Patricia Poussa analyses the speech of these characters in her article Dickens as Sociolinguist. She makes connections between Scandinavian languages and the particular variant of Norfolk dialect spoken in the Flegg area around Great Yarmouth, a place of known Viking settlement. Significantly, the use of 'that' meaning 'it', is used as an example of this apparent connection.

The publication in 2006 by Ethel George (with Carole and Michael Blackwell) of The Seventeenth Child provides a written record of spoken dialect, though in this case of a person brought up inside the city of Norwich. Ethel George was born in 1914, and in 2006 provided the Blackwells with extensive tape-recorded recollections of her childhood as the seventeenth offspring of a relatively poor Norwich family. Carole Blackwell has reproduced a highly literal written rendering of this.

A study of the dialect by Norfolk native and professor of sociolinguistics Peter Trudgill can be found in his book The Norfolk Dialect (2003), published as part of the 'Norfolk Origins' series by Poppyland Publishing, Cromer.

== Notable speakers ==
- Horatio Nelson (1758–1805) – "I am a Norfolk man, and glory in being so"; also said to Captain Hardy "Do you anchor" (an order, not a question, in the Dialect)
- Bernard Matthews (1930–2010) – turkey tycoon

Writers and entertainers

- Maurice Wood (1916–2007) – Bishop of Norwich, recorded the gospel in Norfolk dialect
- Sidney Grapes (1887–1958) – author of The Boy John Letters
- The Nimmo Twins – comedy duo
- Singing Postman – aka Allan Smethurst (1927–2000)
- Keith Skipper – former Norfolk broadcaster and dialect expert
- Peter Trudgill (b. 1943) – professor of sociolinguistics, author of several books on the Norfolk dialect and currently honorary professor of sociolinguistics at the University of East Anglia
- The Kipper Family – exponents of comedy folk, whose traditions are being kept barely alive by Sid Kipper
- Ted Snelling – Norfolk dialect expert and narrator of his audio book "Grandfather's Norwich"
- Sam Larner (1878–1965) – fisherman and traditional singer
- Harry Cox (1885–1971) – farmworker and traditional singer

== See also ==
- Suffolk dialect – bordering Norfolk, the Suffolk dialect has some similar features
