= East Anglian English =

Dialect of English spoken in East Anglia

- East Anglian
- Region: East Anglia and Essex
- Ethnicity: East Anglians
- Language family: Indo-European: Germanic; West Germanic; Ingvaeonic; Anglo-Frisian; Anglic; English; British English; Anglo-English; Southern England English; East Anglian English
- Early forms: Old English: Middle English; Early Modern English
- Writing system: English alphabet

Language codes
- ISO 639-3: –
- Glottolog: sout3285
- IETF: en-u-sd-gbnfk
- Red areas are the commonly agreed upon areas in East Anglia of Norfolk and Suffolk. The pink areas are the areas that are not always agreed upon by scholars containing Essex and Cambridgeshire.

East Anglian English is a dialect of English spoken in the East Anglian region of England, primarily in or before the mid-20th century. East Anglian English has had a very considerable input into modern Estuary English. However, it has received little attention from the media and is not easily recognised by people from other parts of the United Kingdom. The dialect's boundaries are not uniformly agreed upon; for instance, the Fens were traditionally an uninhabited area that was difficult to cross, so there was little dialect contact between the two sides of the Fens leading to certain internal distinctions within that region.

Linguist Peter Trudgill has identified several sub-dialects, including Norfolk (Broad Norfolk, Norwich), Suffolk, Essex, Cambridgeshire, and various Fenland dialects.

== History ==
In Jacek Fisiak's and Peter Trudgill's book, East Anglian English, they describe the important influence East Anglian English has had on the development of the English language. In addition to its influence in the Standard English that is known today all around England, there is evidence according to Oxford English Dictionary that East Anglian English grammar was heard in North Carolina.

Very little is known about the Anglo-Saxon East Anglian dialect; a Suffolk charter (of Æthelflæd, before 991) is included in Sweet (1946:188–89). S. L. Bensusan set out to record elements of the East Anglian dialect and records a statement made by a local when she caught him making notes on the sleeve of his shirt: "Whatever you bin makin' them little owd squiggles on y'r cuff fower?" Bensusan replied that he was "writing history". He then recorded her retort: "You dedn't wanter done that. Telly f'r why. When you've got y'r shirt washed there won't be nawthen left. I've never wrote nawthen all me born days, ne yet me husban', an he got all his teeth an' I kin thread me needle without spectacles. Folk don't wanter write in this world, they wanter do a job o' work."

Trudgill identifies possible influences as the Viking occupation of the area and the Dutch protestant refugees, the Strangers.

== Grammar ==
- Third-person singular zero is the lack of -s in third-person verb conjugations and is considered as the "best-known dialect feature" of East Anglian English. Examples include "she go" or "that say".
- Use of the word do with the meaning of or, or else otherwise, for example "You better go to bed now, do you’ll be tired in the morning" And do idiomatically used as "now you must"
- That is used in place of central pronoun it, e.g. "that's cloudy", "that's hot out there" and "that book, that's okay, I like it". The final example still uses it, but only when it is the object of a verb. The word that usually denotes it when it is the subject of the clause, so that "it is" becomes "that is" and "it smells funny" becomes "that smell funny". This does not imply emphatic usage as it would in Standard English and indeed sentences such as "When that rain, we get wet", are entirely feasible in the dialect. (Incidentally, it is almost never heard as the first word of a sentence in the speech of a true Norfolk dialect speaker, e.g. "It's a nice day today" is virtually always rendered by "Thass a nice day today".)
- Time is used to mean while, for example, "You sit down, time I get dinner ready."
- Now can also mean just, i.e. "I am now leaving" also means "I am just leaving".
- Some verbs conjugate differently in Norfolk or Suffolk. The past tense of 'show', for example is 'shew', and of the verb to snow, 'snew', swam becomes 'swum'. The past of drive is 'driv'. e.g. 'I driv all the way to Yarmouth, and on the way back that snew.' 'Sang' is always 'sung' ('She sung out of tune'), and 'stank' is always 'stunk' ('After they had mucked out the pigs their clothes stunk'). Many verbs simply have no past tense, and use the present form. e.g. 'Come', 'say' and 'give'. 'When my husband come home, he say he give tuppence for a loaf of bread' meaning 'When he came home, he said, he gave tuppence...'. This even applies to a verb like 'go'. 'Every time they go get the needle out, it moved'. Verbs whose past participles differ from their active past tenses e.g. 'spoken', are mostly ignored in Norfolk. e.g. 'If you were clever you were spoke to more often by the teacher', or 'If I hadn't went up to Mousehold that night'.
- The present participle, or ...ing, form of the verb, such as running, writing etc. is mostly rendered in the Middle English form of 'a-runnin, 'a-jumpin etc. 'She's a-robbin' me'.

== Vocabulary ==
- abed – in bed
- bishybarnybee – a ladybird
- bor – neighbour (or friend) in Norfolk
- cor blarst me – "god blast me", when expressing, shock, surprise or exasperation
- craze – nag. e.g. he kept crazing me to buy him sweets, or I'd craze her and craze her)
- dag – dew
- dene – the sandy area by the coast
- dew yew keep a throshin – means "carry on with the threshing" on its own in Norfolk but also means goodbye or "take care of yourself"
- dickey – donkey; however note that the word 'donkey' appears only to have been in use in English since the late 18th century "apparently of dialect or slang origin" and attributed to Suffolk and Essex. The Oxford English Dictionary quotes 'dicky' as one of the alternative slang terms for an ass..)
- directly – "as soon as" or "immediately"), as in "Directly they got their money on Friday nights, the women would get the suits out of the pawn shop"
- dodman – a term used to refer to a snail
- dow – a pigeon
- dwile – floorcloth
- dudder – shiver or tremble (not necessarily unique to Norfolk, it appears in the OED as dodder)
- finish, at the/in the – eventually, as in "he gave it to her at the finish"; or "You might as well have went in the beginning, 'cause you had to go in the finish".)
- get on to someone – to tell someone off, as in "They all went quiet, but they never got onto father no more")
- gays – the pictures printed on a book or a newspaper
- grup – refers to a small trench
- guzunder – chamber pot (derived from "goes-under")
- hutkin – used for a finger protector
- mawkin – a scarecrow
- mawther – local word referring to a girl or young woman
- on the huh, on the moo - askew
- pit – a pond
- push – a boil or pimple
- quant – punt pole
- ranny – term meaning 'shrew'
- sowpig – a woodlouse
- staithe – an archaic term still used to reference any landing stage
- stroop – the throat

== Accent ==
East Anglian English shows some of the general accent features of South East England, including:

- Non-rhoticity; in fact, one of the first English-speaking regions to lose rhoticity;
- G-dropping;
- The trap–bath split, though the quality of BATH may be fronter than RP;
- The foot–strut split, though the quality of STRUT, /ʌ/, may be more back and close than that of RP;
- Widespread glottal reinforcement of stop consonants, so that /p, t, k/ are pronounced with the glottal closure slightly following the oral closure, so that upper is pronounced as [ʌpʔə], better as [betʔə] or now commonly [beʔə], and thicker as [θɪkʔə].

However, several features also make East Anglian accents unique:

=== Vowels ===
- Norfolk smoothing results in a pronunciation of two or three vowel syllables with a single long vowel; for example, player is [plæː] rather than /pleɪ.ə/. Where the suffix -ing is preceded by a vowel or diphthong, there is a smoothing effect that results in a single vowel. Thus go+ing is usually pronounced as a single syllable [ɡɔːn] rather than as a two-syllable word ending in /ən/, and doing is [dɜːn] rather than /duː.ɪŋ/. This phenomenon is the only one in East Anglia that is spreading, in the 21st century, from north to south (the opposite direction from the typical south-to-north influences coming out of London).
- The vowel found in BATH/PALM/START is a very front vowel [aː], unlike RP or London English where it is a back vowel.
- Words containing /aʊ/ sounds (as in MOUTH) can be more fronted or raised compared against most other English dialects: often, [æʉ] or [ɛʉ].
- Single-syllable words with the vowel spelt ⟨oo⟩ such as roof and hoof have the vowel [ʊ] to give [rʊf] and [hʊf] respectively.
- The toe–tow merger typical of most Modern English dialects may continue to be resisted. The GOAT vowel (/əʊ/ in RP) generally has a quality that can be represented with a narrow glide like [ʊu] in Norfolk: thus words with the spelling ⟨oa⟩, ⟨oe⟩ and ⟨oCe⟩ such as boat, toe, code sound to outsiders like boot, too, cood respectively. An exception is that of words spelt with ⟨ou⟩, ⟨ow⟩, ⟨ol⟩ such as soul, know, told which have a wider glide quite similar to the RP [əʊ], or even wider [ʌu]. However, the toe-tow merger is indeed well-established in Ipswich (Suffolk) and Colchester (Essex), in the 21st century expanding gradually into Norfolk.
  - A third phonetic distinction once existed within the GOAT set, causing a subset of these words (specifically, certain closed- and single-syllable words), such as coat, don't, home, stone, and whole to be pronounced with /ʊ/. Thus, whole was a homophone with hull: [hʊl]. This was extremely old-fashioned even by the late 20th century.
- The pane–pain merger typical of most Modern English dialects may continue to be resisted. In the speech of older Norwich residents and in rural East Anglia, the FACE vowel, /eɪ/, is [æɪ] in words spelt with ⟨ai⟩ or ⟨ay⟩ such as rain and day, but [eː] or [ɛː] (similar to air) in words spelt ⟨aCe⟩ such as take, late. This has largely given way throughout most of East Anglia to a merger towards [æɪ].
- The near-square merger variably occurs, particularly among the working class, so that the NEAR and SQUARE vowels /ɪə/ and /eə/ sound the same in Norwich. Thus beer and bear sound the same, the vowel quality being [ɛː]. This may be considered to be a related case to that of smoothing.
- /ɜːr/ as in NURSE is pronounced [a] or [ɐ]: [nɐs]. Since the mid-20th century, this very open realisation has largely disappeared, at least in urban East Anglia.
- /aɪ/ (as in PRICE) is traditionally [ɐi], a narrower glide than RP, but since the second half of the 20th century, a backer realisation is favoured, [ɑi].

=== Consonants ===
- Yod-dropping occurs after all consonants. Yod-dropping after alveolar consonants (/t, d, s, z, n, l/) is found in many English accents, and widely in American pronunciation, so that words like tune, due, sue, new are pronounced /tuːn/, /duː/, /suː/, /nuː/, sounding like toon, doo, soo, noo. Additionally, in East Anglia, yod-dropping is found after any consonant, and this seems to be a unique regionalism. Therefore, RP [Cjuː] is pronounced as Norfolk [Cuː] (where C stands for any consonant). For example, beautiful, few, huge, accuse have pronunciations that sound like bootiful, foo, hooge, akooz. A parallel case involves the vowel of CURE: in RP the word is pronounced with initial /kj/, but Norfolk speakers omit the /j/ and smoothing results in /ɜː/ so that cure sounds like cur.
- H-dropping is rarer than in most other parts of England. (However, H-dropping is indeed typical in urban Norwich.)
- Clear L is possible in all contexts in speakers born before 1920. In contexts where RP pronounces /l/ as "dark L" ([ɫ]), these older Norfolk speakers have "clear L" so that the sound in hill and milk sounds similar to the clear L heard at the beginning of words such as lip. The process known as L-vocalization (whereby, for example, the /l/ in hill, well, help is pronounced as a back rounded vowel like /ʊ/) is not as widespread in this accent as elsewhere in Southern England, though it is increasingly prevalent in Suffolk.

=== Prosody ===
In addition to the above phonological features, East Anglian English also has a distinct rhythm. This is due to the loss of unstressed syllables associated with East Anglian speakers. There appears to be no agreed framework for describing the prosodic characteristics of different dialects (see Intonation). Writing in 1889, the phonetician Alexander John Ellis began his section on East Anglian speech with these comments:

Every one has heard of the [Norfolk] 'drant', or droning and drawling in speech, and the [Suffolk] 'whine,' but they are neither of them points which can be properly brought under consideration here, because intonation has been systematically neglected, as being impossible to symbolise satisfactorily, even in the rare cases where it could be studied.

There does appear to be agreement that the Norfolk accent has a distinctive rhythm due to some stressed vowels being longer than their equivalents in RP and some unstressed vowels being much shorter. Claims that Norfolk speech has intonation with a distinctive "lilt" lack robust empirical evidence.

=== Norwich accent ===
In addition to above features, one specific accent is associated with urban Norfolk and namely its largest city, Norwich.

- Whereas RP has the rounded LOT vowel /ɒ/ in words containing the spellings ⟨f⟩, ⟨ff⟩, ⟨gh⟩ or ⟨th⟩ (such as often, off, cough, trough and cloth), Norfolk may have /ɔː/ as in the vowel of THOUGHT. This is a manifestation of the lot-cloth split.
- The vowel /ɒ/ of LOT is traditionally realised as an unrounded vowel [ɑ]. However, the rounded RP variant is encroaching even in urban Norwich.
- In older Norfolk dialect the spelling ⟨thr⟩ could be pronounced as /tr/ and the spelling ⟨shr⟩ as /sr/; thus three sounds the same as tree and shriek is pronounced as /sriːk/.
- Norfolk smoothing (mentioned above) is particularly advanced.

== Portrayal ==
Charles Dickens had some grasp of the Norfolk accent which he utilised in the speech of the Yarmouth fishermen, Ham and Daniel Peggoty in David Copperfield. Patricia Poussa analyses the speech of these characters in her article Dickens as Sociolinguist. She makes connections between Scandinavian languages and the particular variant of Norfolk dialect spoken in the Flegg area around Great Yarmouth, a place of known Viking settlement. Significantly, the use of 'that' meaning 'it', is used as an example of this apparent connection.

Arnold Wesker's 1958 play Roots used Norfolk dialect.

During the 1960s, Anglia Television produced a soap opera called Weavers Green which used local characters making extensive use of Norfolk dialect. The programme was filmed at the "cul-de-sac" village of Heydon, north of Reepham in mid Norfolk.

An example of the Norfolk accent and vocabulary can be heard in the songs by Allan Smethurst, aka The Singing Postman. Smethurst's Norfolk accent is well known from his releases of the 1960s, such as "Hev Yew Gotta Loight, Boy?". The Boy John Letters of Sidney Grapes, which were originally published in the Eastern Daily Press, are another valid example of the Norfolk dialect. Beyond simply portrayers of speech and idiom however, Smethurst, and more especially Grapes, record their authentic understanding of mid-20th century Norfolk village life. Grapes' characters, the Boy John, Aunt Agatha, Granfar, and Ole Missus W, perform a literary operetta celebrating down-to-earth ordinariness over bourgeois affectation and pretence.

The treatment of the Norfolk dialect in the television drama All the King's Men in 1999 in part prompted the foundation of the Friends of Norfolk Dialect (FOND), a group formed with the aim of preserving and promoting Broad Norfolk.

The publication in 2006 by Ethel George (with Carole and Michael Blackwell) of The Seventeenth Child provides a written record of spoken dialect, though in this case of a person brought up inside the city of Norwich. Ethel George was born in 1914, and in 2006 provided the Blackwells with extensive tape-recorded recollections of her childhood as the seventeenth offspring of a relatively poor Norwich family. Carole Blackwell has reproduced a highly literal written rendering of this.

An erudite and comprehensive study of the dialect by Norfolk native and professor of sociolinguistics Peter Trudgill can be found in his book The Norfolk Dialect (2003), published as part of the 'Norfolk Origins' series by Poppyland Publishing, Cromer.

== Notable speakers ==
- Horatio Nelson (1758–1805) – "I am a Norfolk man, and glory in being so"; also said to Captain Hardy "Do you anchor" (an order, not a question, in the Dialect)
- Bernard Matthews (1930–2010) – turkey tycoon
- Chris Sutton (b. 1973) – footballer turned pundit
- Martin Brundle (b. 1959) – racing driver and commentator
- Basil Brown (1888–1977) – Archaeologist; whose Suffolk dialect was later portrayed by Ralph Fiennes in the 2021 film, The Dig
- Maurice Wood (1916–2007) – Bishop of Norwich, recorded the gospel in Norfolk dialect
- Sidney Grapes (1887–1958) – author of The Boy John Letters
- The Nimmo Twins – comedy duo
- Singing Postman – aka Allan Smethurst (1927–2000)
- Keith Skipper – former Norfolk broadcaster and dialect expert
- Peter Trudgill (b. 1943) – professor of sociolinguistics, author of several books on the Norfolk dialect and currently honorary professor of sociolinguistics at the University of East Anglia
- The Kipper Family – exponents of comedy folk, whose traditions are being kept barely alive by Sid Kipper
- Ted Snelling – Norfolk dialect expert and narrator of his audio book "Grandfather's Norwich"
- Sam Larner (1878–1965) – fisherman and traditional singer
- Harry Cox (1885–1971) – farmworker and traditional singer
- Kieron Dyer – footballer

== See also ==
- List of dialects of the English language
- English language in Southern England

== Bibliography ==
- Bensusan, Samuel Levy (1949), Right Forward Folk, Routledge & Kegan Paul
- George, Ethel (2006). The seventeenth child : memories of a Norwich childhood 1914-1934. With Carole and Michael Blackwell. Dereham: Larks Press. ISBN 978-1904006305.
- Lodge, Ken (2009), A Critical Introduction to Phonetics, Continuum International Publishing Group, ISBN 978-0-8264-8873-2
- Trudgill, Peter (2001), "Modern East Anglia as a dialect area", in Fisiak, Jacek; Trudgill, Peter (eds.), East Anglian English, Boydell & Brewer, pp. 1–12, ISBN 978-0-85991-571-7
- Trudgill, Peter (2003), The Norfolk Dialect, Poppyland
- Trudgill, Peter (2021), East Anglian English, De Gruyter Mouton
- Sweet, Henry (1946), Onions, Charles Talbut (ed.), Sweet's Anglo-Saxon Reader (10th ed.), Oxford: Clarendon Press
- Wells, John C. (1982), Accents of English, Vol. 1: An Introduction (pp. i–xx, 1–278), Vol. 2: The British Isles (pp. i–xx, 279–466), Cambridge University Press, doi:10.1017/CBO9780511611759, ISBN 0-52129719-2, 0-52128540-2
