= Southern Rural English =

Southern Rural English may refer to:

- Rural varieties of English in southern England
- Southern American English, also known as "Rural White Southern English"
