= Reduplicated plural =

Linguistic phenomenon

A reduplicated plural is a grammatical form achieved by the superfluous use of a second plural ending.

In English the plural is usually formed with the addition of 's': e.g. one cat, two cats; one chair, two chairs. In the Sussex dialect, however, until relatively recently there existed a reduplicated plural: e.g. one ghost, two ghostes/ghostesses; one post, two postes/postesses (note that here the Sussex pluralisation instead of adding just 's' after 'st', adds either 'es' as its usual plural, or a reduplicated 'esses'. Reduplicated plural forms, or similar forms, can also appear in African American Vernacular English, New York Latino English, and in some other rarer forms of American English, often in specific lexical items, such as testes /tɛstɪz/ rather than tests /tɛsts/.

Donald Mackenzie suggests that in Kipling's in Puck of Pook's Hill the word 'pharisees' apparently used by Shoesmith for fairies was formed as a Sussex reduplicated plural.

In The Hobbit and The Lord of the Rings, the character Gollum speaks with reduplicated plurals, often complaining about "sneaky little hobbitses".
