= Trunch =

Village in Norfolk, England

Coordinates: 52.86°N 1.39°E

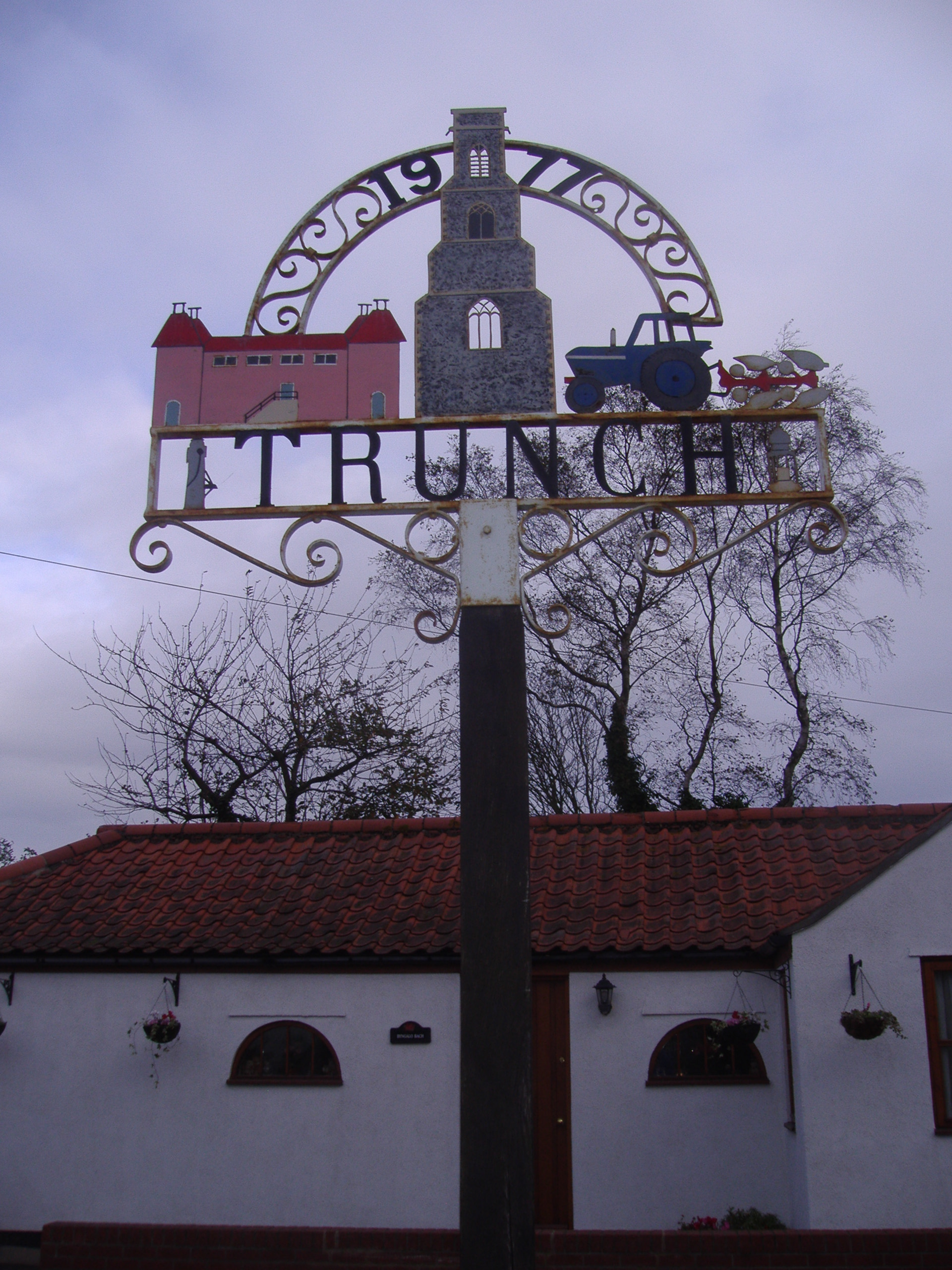
- The village sign

- Location within Norfolk
- Area: 5.49 km^{2} (2.12 sq mi)
- Population: 909 (parish, 2011 census)
  - Density: Proper
- OS grid reference: TG2834
  - London: 134
- Civil parish: Trunch
- District: North Norfolk
- Shire county: Norfolk
- Region: East
- Country: England
- Sovereign state: United Kingdom
- Post town: NORTH WALSHAM
- Postcode district: NR28
- Dialling code: 01263
- Police: Norfolk
- Fire: Norfolk
- Ambulance: East of England
- UK Parliament: North Norfolk

Trunch is a village and parish in Norfolk, England, situated three miles north of North Walsham and two miles from the coast at Mundesley. At the Census 2011 the village had a population of 909. The parish covers an area of 5.5 square kilometres (2.1 sq mi).

Trunch has never had any rail connections in the village itself but it does have a rail map outside its pub. Before the 1960s one could go to the next village along (Knapton) to catch a train to Cromer or North Walsham from Paston & Knapton railway station (M&GN) to catch a train. Now the nearest stations are Gunton and North Walsham.

== Etymology ==
The name Trunch is first attested in the Domesday Book of 1086, as Trunchet, a form found into the thirteenth century. The form Truch appears in 1203 and the form Trunch is first attested in 1254. The name has occasioned considerable uncertainty. An old suggestion that the name comes from Tronchet, a French monastery that owned land in Norfolk, fell out of favour by the twenty-first century. The second element of the name is instead accepted to be the Common Brittonic word found in modern Welsh as coed ("woodland"). The origin of the first element has also occasioned debate, with a word related to Welsh trwyn ("nose, headland") being mooted. But in 2000, Andrew Breeze concluded that the first element was related to Welsh trum ("back") and that the name once meant "ridge by a wood".

== St Botolph's Parish Church ==
Trunch Parish Church is the Grade I listed 14th-century church of St Botolph. The church is famous for its carved and painted wood font canopy featuring lower panels with paintings of the twelve Apostles, a cornice including a Latin inscription, and above six arches filled with tracery. Only four such canopies still exist in England. St Botolph's also features a hammerbeam roof with carved angels, as well as medieval misericords under the seats in the chancel. Another medieval survival is the rood screen depicting 11 disciples and St Paul (their faces were scratched out during the Reformation). Lord Nelson's daughter is said to have been married in the church.

In 1589 Robert Thexton became the rector of Trunch. While at Corpus Christi College, Cambridge, Thexton had been the roommate of Christopher Marlowe, the Elizabethan playwright.

== In popular culture ==
The fictional village of St Just-near-Trunch is known in English folk music as the home of the former satirical folk duo, The Kipper Family.

== Gallery ==
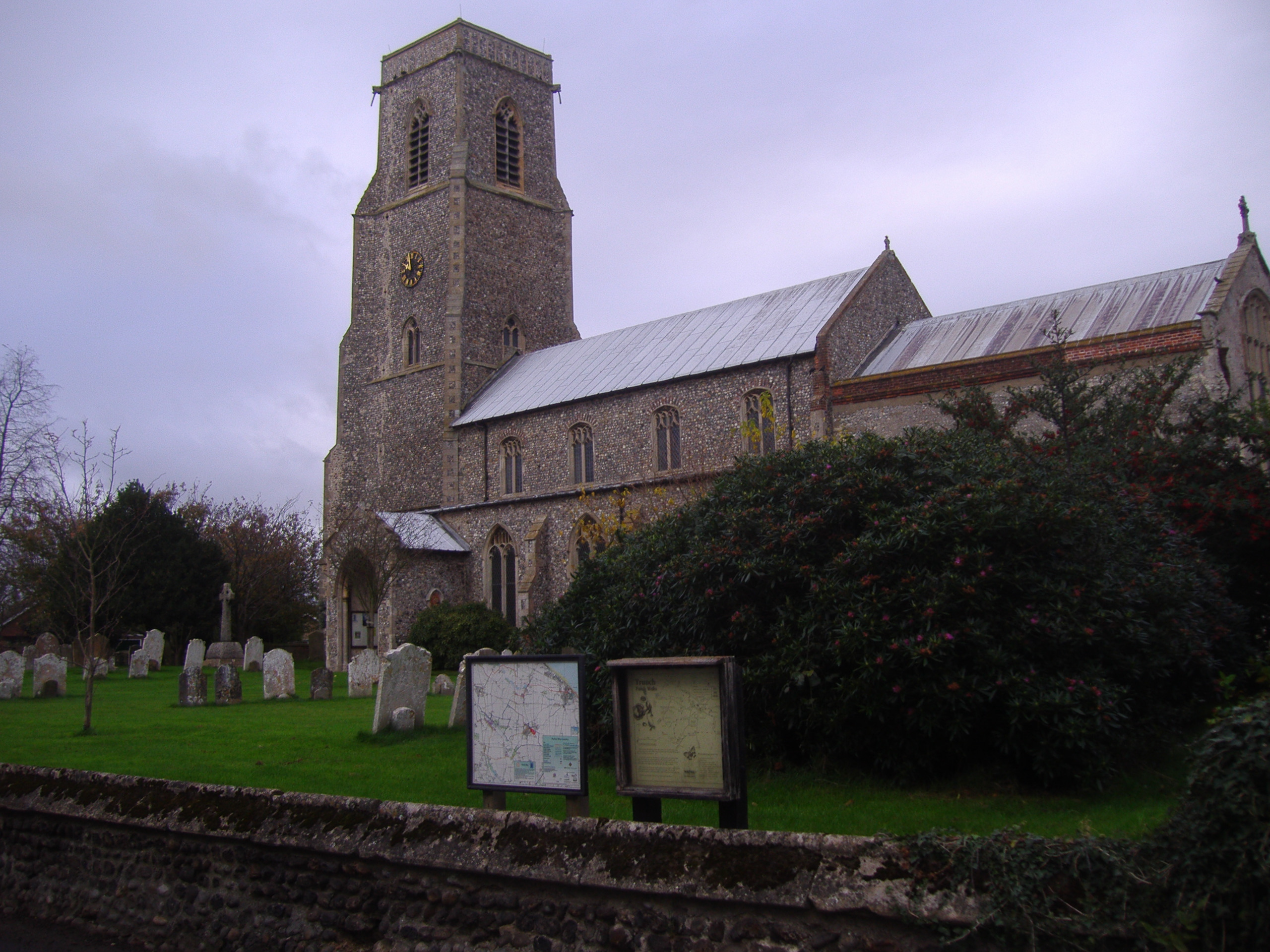
The parish church

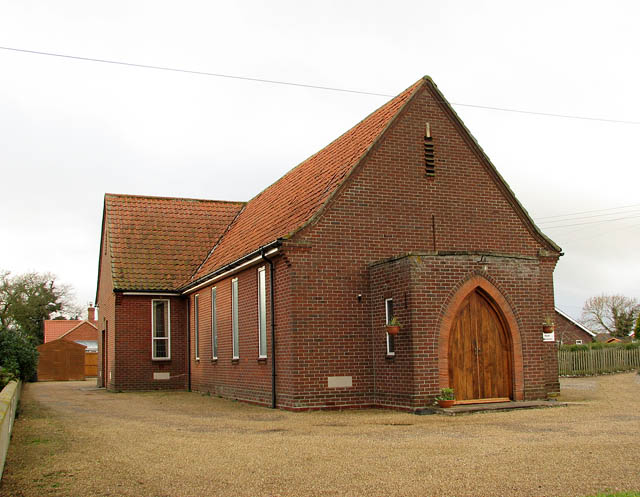
The Methodist Church

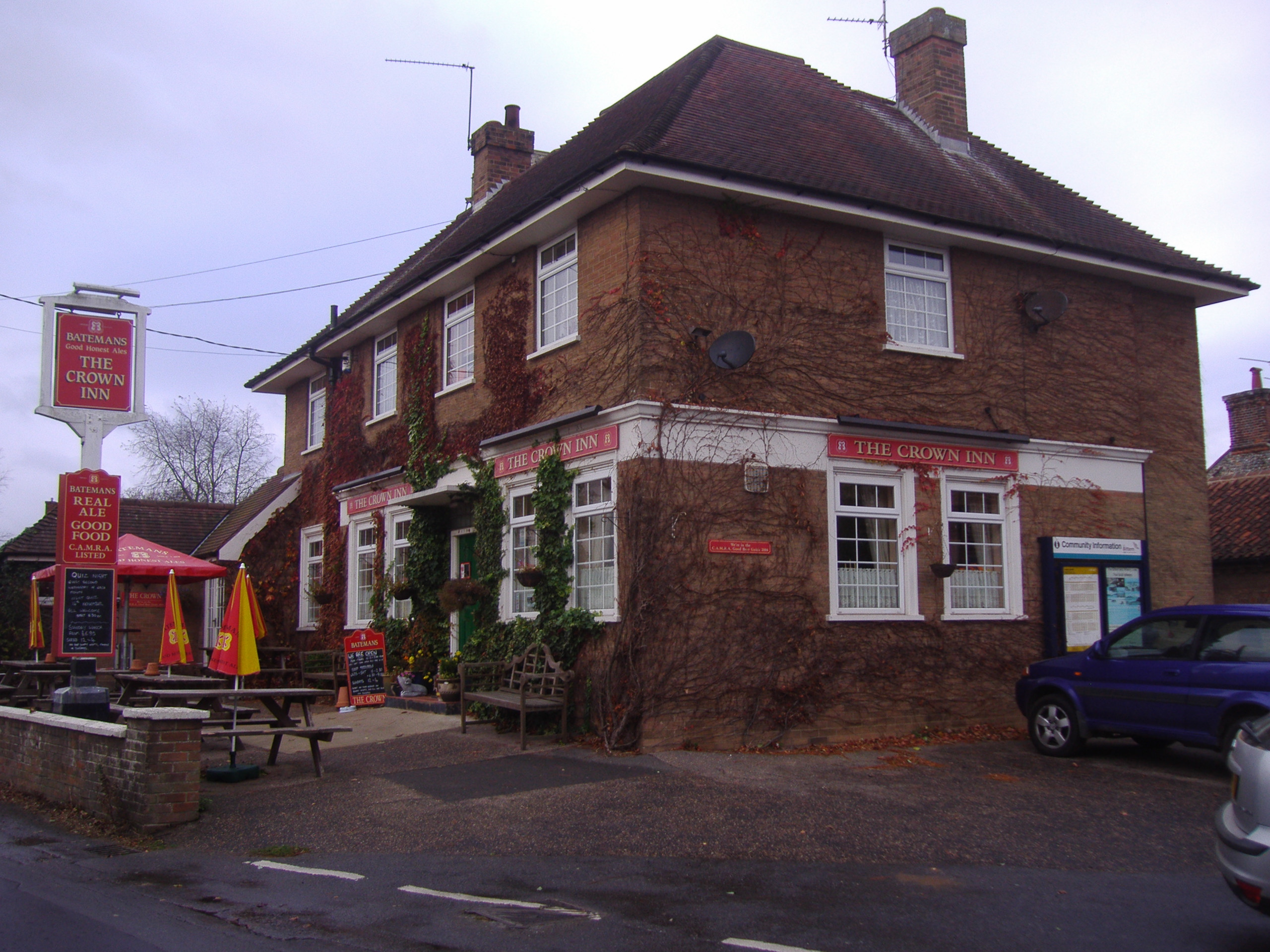
The Crown public house, Trunch

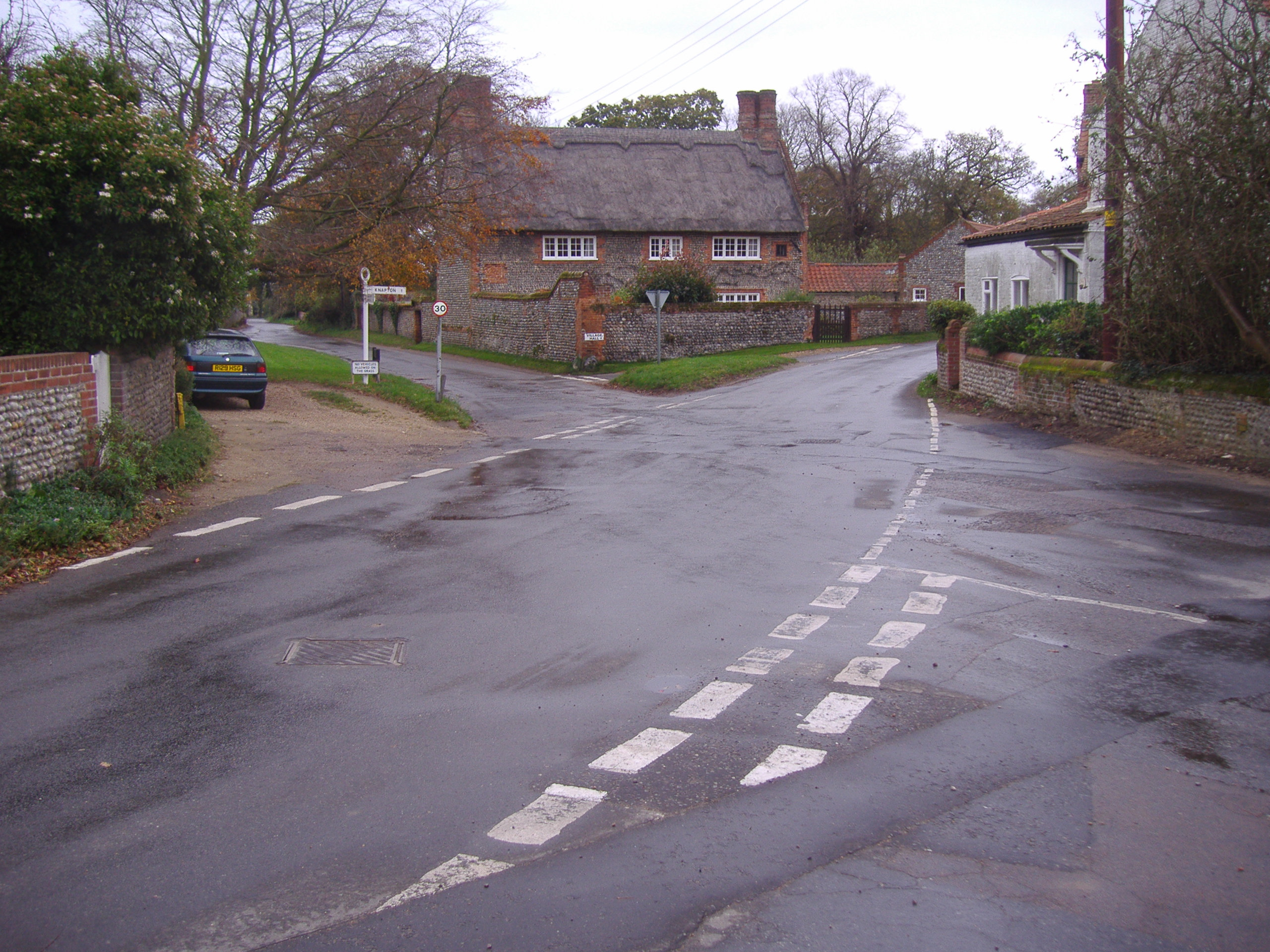
A view of the village
