= English language in Southern England =

Accents and dialects of modern-day southern England

Southern England English
- Region: South England and East Anglia
- Language family: Indo-European: Germanic; West Germanic; Ingvaeonic; Anglo-Frisian; Anglic; English; British English; Anglo-English; Southern England English
- Early forms: Old English: Middle English; Early Modern English
- Writing system: English alphabet

Language codes
- ISO 639-3: –

English in Southern England (Note: Also, rarely, Southern English English; Southern England English; or in the UK, simply, Southern English.) is the collective set of different dialects and accents of Modern English spoken in Southern England.

As of the 21st century, a wide class of dialects labelled "Estuary English" is on the rise in southeastern England, including the home counties (the counties bordering London), which was the traditional interface between the London urban region and more local rural accents.

The Foot-strut split: An isogloss of the vowel in the word sun in England

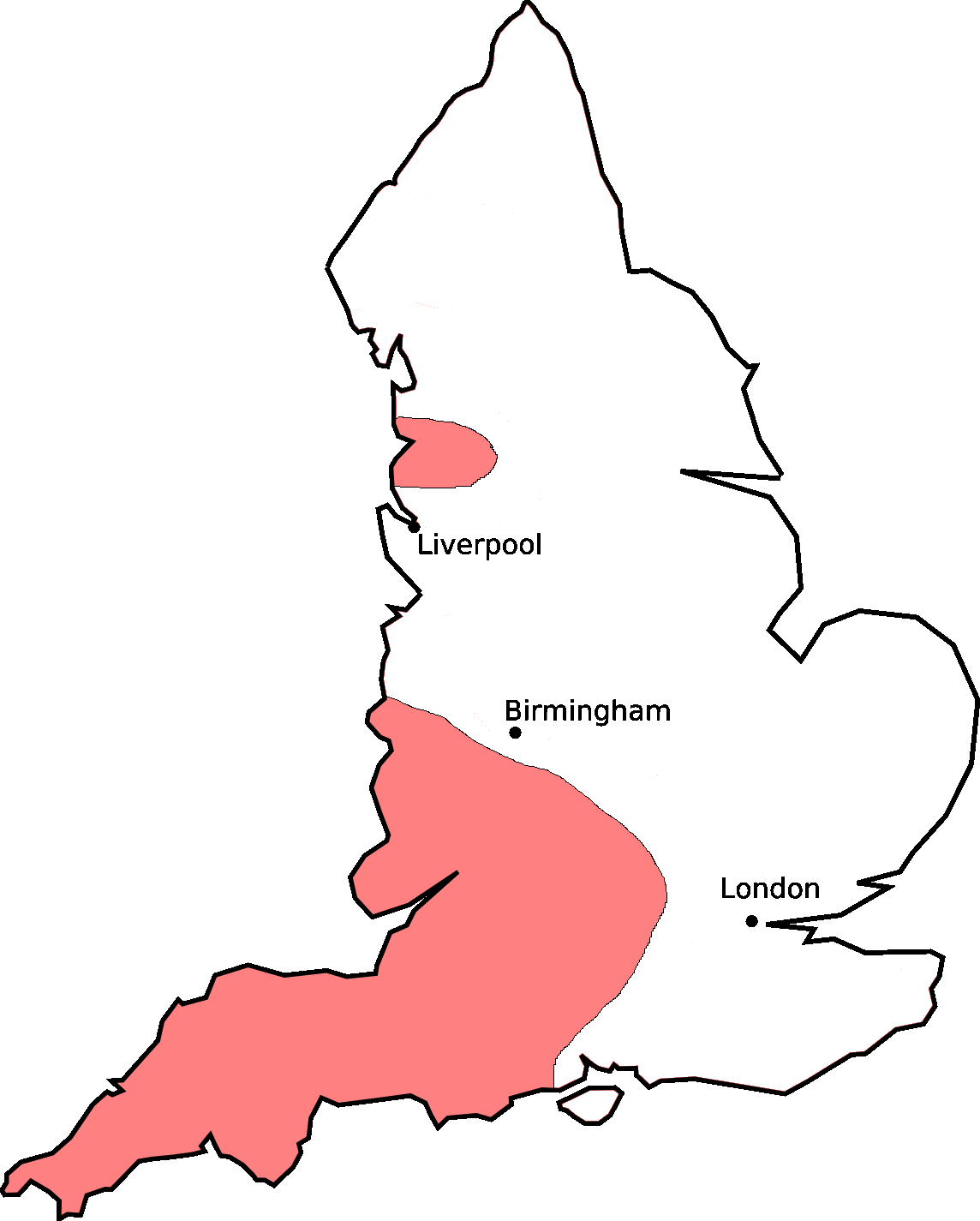
Red areas are where English dialects of the late 20th century were rhotic; in the South, all of South West England and some of South East England are included.

Commentators report widespread homogenisation in southern England in the 20th century (Kerswill & Williams 2000; Britain 2002). This involved a process of levelling between the extremes of working-class Cockney in inner-city London and the careful upper-class standard accent of southern England, Received Pronunciation (RP), popular in the 20th century with upper-middle- and upper-class residents. Now spread throughout the South East region, Estuary English is the resulting mainstream accent that combines features of both Cockney and a more middle-class RP. Less affluent areas have variants of Estuary English that grade into southern rural England outside urban areas.

Outside of South East England, West Country English (of South West England) and East Anglian English survive as traditional broad dialects in Southern England today, though they too are heavily subject to Estuary English influence in recent decades and are consequently weakening.

== London and Estuary English ==
Since the 19th century, accents of London, and since the late 20th century, all accents of the home counties and the greater Thames Estuary are firmly non-rhotic: that is, the consonant sound /r/ (phonetically [ɹ]) occurs only before vowels.

General characteristics of all major London accents include:

- diphthongal realisation of /iː/ and /uː/, for example beat [ˈbɪiʔ], boot [ˈbʊʉʔ] (this can also be a monophthong: [bʉːʔ])
- diphthongal realisation of /ɔː/ in open syllables, for example bore [ˈbɔə], paw [ˈpɔə] versus a monophthongal realisation in closed syllables, for example board [ˈboːd], pause [ˈpoːz]. But the diphthong is retained before inflectional endings, so that board and pause often contrast with bored [ˈbɔəd] and paws [ˈpɔəz].
- lengthening of /æ/ in words such as man, sad, bag, hand (cf. can, had, lad): split of /æ/ into two phonemes /æ/ and /æː/. See bad–lad split.
- an allophone of /əʊ/ before "dark L" ([ɫ]), namely [ɒʊ], for example whole [ˈhɒʊɫ] versus holy [ˈhəʊli]. But the [ɒʊ] is retained when the addition of a suffix turns the "dark L" clear, so that wholly [ˈhɒʊli] can contrast with holy.

Features of working- or middle-class Estuary English, spoken in the counties all around London in the 21st century, include:

- Not as much h-dropping as Cockney, but still more than RP
- Increased amount of th-fronting, like Cockney
- GOAT fronting to [əʏ]
- MOUTH can take the more RP variant of [aʊ]
- PRICE has a low-back onset, [ɑɪ], or the lowered/unrounded from [ʌɪ], or [ɔɪ] or [ɒɪ]
- FACE can have an onset lower than RP but higher than Cockney: [ɛ̝ɪ]
- GOOSE fronted to [ʏː]
- FOOT fronted
- TRAP lowers and backs, different from both RP and Cockney

It retains some aspects of Cockney, such as the vocalisation of [ɫ] (dark L) to [o], and yod-coalescence in stressed syllables (for example, duty [dʒʉːʔi]) and replacement of [t] with [ʔ] (the glottal stop) in weak positions, or occasionally with d). Wells notes traditional aspects of rural South East speech as lengthened [æː] in trap words and use of [eɪ] or [ɛʊ] in mouth words.

=== Cockney ===
Cockney is the traditional accent of the working classes of the areas immediately within and surrounding the City of London itself (most famously the East End). It is characterised by many phonological differences from RP:

- The dental fricatives [θ, ð] are replaced with labiodental [f, v], for example think [fɪŋk]
- The diphthong /aʊ/ is monophthongized to [æː], for example south [sæːf]
- H-dropping, for example house [æːs]
- Replacement of [t] in the middle or end of a word with a glottal stop; for example hit [ɪʔ]
- Diphthong shift of /iː/ to [əi] (for example beet [bəiʔ]), /eɪ/ to [aɪ] (for example bait [baɪʔ]), /aɪ/ to [ɒɪ] (for example bite [bɒɪʔ]), and /ɔɪ/ to [oɪ] (for example, boy [boɪ].
- Vocalisation of [ɫ] (dark L) to [ɤ~o~ʊ~ɯ], for example, people [pəipɯ]

=== Multicultural London English ===
Multicultural London English (abbreviated MLE), colloquially called Blockney, is a dialect (and/or sociolect) of English that emerged in the late 20th century. It is spoken mainly by youths in multicultural parts of working-class London.

The speech of Jamaicans, or children of Jamaican parents, in London shows interesting combinations of the Jamaican accent with the London accent. For example, in Jamaican English, /θ/ is replaced by [t], for example both /boːt/. In London, word-final /t/ is realised as [ʔ], as mentioned above. In Jamaican-London speech, glottalization of /t/ applies also to /t/ from /θ/, for example both of them [bʌʊʔ ə dem]. Hypercorrections like [fʊθ] for foot are also heard from Jamaicans. John C. Wells's dissertation, Jamaican pronunciation in London, was published by the Philological Society in 1973.

== West Country English ==
South West England or "West Country" English is a family of similar strongly rhotic accents, now perceived as rural. It originally extended an even larger region, across much of South East England, including an area south of the "broad A" isogloss, but the modern West Country dialects are now most often classified west of a line roughly from Shropshire via Oxfordshire. Their shared characteristics have been caricatured as Mummerset.

They persist most strongly in areas that remain largely rural with a largely indigenous population, particularly the West Country. In many other areas they are declining because of RP and Estuary accents moving to the area; for instance, strong Isle of Wight accents tend to be more prevalent in older speakers.

As well as rhoticity, here are common features of West Country accents:

- The diphthong /aɪ/ (as in price) realised as [ʌi] or [ɔi], sounding more like the diphthong in Received Pronunciation choice.
- The diphthong /aʊ/ (as in mouth) realised as [ɛʏ], with a starting point close to the vowel in Received Pronunciation dress.
- The vowel /ɒ/ (as in lot) realised as an unrounded vowel [ɑ], as in many forms of American English.
- In traditional West Country accents, the voiceless fricatives /s/, /f/, /θ/, /ʃ/ (as in sat, farm, think, shed respectively) are often voiced to [z], [v], [ð], [ʒ], giving pronunciations like "Zummerzet" for Somerset, "varm" for farm, "zhure" for sure, etc.
- In the Bristol area a vowel at the end of a word is often followed by an intrusive dark l, [ɫ]. Hence the old joke about the three Bristolian sisters Evil, Idle, and Normal (written Eva, Ida, and Norma). L is pronounced darkly where it is present, too, which means that in Bristolian rendering, 'idea' and 'ideal' are homophones.
- H-dropping in South Devon and Cornwall, "Berry 'Aid" for Berry Head (in Brixham, South Devon)

In traditional Southern rural accents, the voiceless fricatives /s/, /f/, /θ/, /ʃ/ always remain voiceless, which is the main difference from West Country accents.

== East Anglian English ==
Features which can be found in East Anglian English (particularly Norfolk) speakers born before the late 20th century include:

- Yod-dropping after all consonants: beautiful may be pronounced [ˈbʉːʔɪfəl], often represented as "bootiful" or "bewtiful", huge as [ˈhʉːdʒ], and so on.
- Absence of the long mid merger between Early Modern English /oː/ (as in toe, moan, road, boat) and /ɔʊ/ (as in tow, mown, rowed). The vowel of toe, moan, road, boat may be realised as [ʊu], so that boat may sound to outsiders like boot.
- Glottal stop frequent for /t/.
- The diphthong /aɪ/ (as in price) realised as [ɔɪ], sounding very much like the diphthong in Received Pronunciation choice.
- The vowel /ɒ/ (as in lot) realised as an unrounded vowel [ɑ], as in many forms of American English.
- Merger of the vowels of near and square (RP /ɪə/ and /ɛə/), making chair and cheer homophones.
- East Anglian accents are generally non-rhotic.

There are differences between and even within areas of East Anglia: the Norwich accent has distinguishing aspects from the Norfolk dialect that surrounds it – chiefly in the vowel sounds. The accent of Cambridgeshire is different from the Norfolk accent, whilst Suffolk has greater similarities to that of Norfolk.

== 19th-century Southeastern English ==
In the 19th century, the home counties surrounding London, forming the bulk of southeastern England outside of East Anglia, spoke with what today would be lumped under a southwestern England or "West Country" dialect, with front MOUTH, front START, and high (or even round) PRICE vowels predominating, all of which were also shared with rural traditional East Anglian English. Cambridgeshire fits this designation as well.

At the time, Berkshire, Hampshire, Surrey, Sussex, Buckinghamshire, and Kent were rhotic, though this was recessive by the mid-20th century. Still, parts of West Berkshire were still rhotic or variably rhotic even into the late 20th century. Sussex and Kentish rhoticity lasted until as recently as the early 21st century in certain small pockets. In country areas and Southampton, the older rhotic accent could still be heard amongst 20th-century speakers, for example in the speech of John Arlott, Lord Denning and Reg Presley. Hertfordshire and Essex, meanwhile, were already less rhotic by the 19th century. The spread of non-rhoticity throughout all these counties is usually associated with the emergence of a non-local 20th-century variety with diffused Cockney elements, Estuary English, mainly in urban areas receiving an influx of East London migrants since World War II. "Estuary-isms" are even found in Portsmouth or "Pompey" English.

In the 18th and early 19th centuries, in Essex, Kent, and east Sussex, plus several other eastern areas including London, Suffolk, and Norfolk, /v/ was pronounced as /w/ in pre-vocalic position: thus, village sounded like willage and venom like wenom. In the 19th century, across all of Southern England, arter without an f (non-rhotically, /ˈɑːtə(r)/) was a common pronunciation of after.

The pattern of speech in some of Charles Dickens' books pertains to Kentish dialect, as the author lived at Higham, was familiar with the mudflats near Rochester and created a comic character Sam Weller who spoke the local accent, principally Kentish but with strong London influences.

The vowel /ɒ/ (as in LOT) is very occasionally used for the STRUT vowel, normally /ʌ/; it has been reported as a minority variant in Kent and Essex.

Modern Estuary dialect features were also reported in some 19th-century varieties, including L-vocalisation e.g. old as owd, as well as yod-coalescence in Kent.

=== Essex ===
The East Anglian feature of complete yod-dropping was also common in 19th-century Essex. Th-fronting, a feature now widespread throughout England (three as free), was found even more strongly in Essex than in London in the Survey of English Dialects' study of speakers born in the late 1800s. Many words are unique to 19th-century Essex dialect, some examples including bonx meaning "to beat up batter for pudding" and hodmedod or hodmadod meaning "snail". Several nonstandard grammatical features exist, such as irregular plural forms like housen for "houses".

Mersea Island (though largely not the rest of Essex) showed some rhoticity in speakers born as late as the early 20th century.

=== Surrey ===
A distinct dialect existed as recently as the late 19th century in the historic county of Surrey, in western Kent, and in parts of northern Sussex, though it has now almost entirely died out. In addition to the accent features described above, Surrey showed long-standing yod-coalescence, now typical of dialects throughout England. Unique Surrey vocabulary was first documented by Granville W. G. Leveson Gower during the 1870s, who published his Glossary of Surrey Words in 1893. Gower expressed a fear that improved transport and the spread of education would cause such local dialects to be lost despite the fact that, in his words, "Old customs, old beliefs, old prejudices die hard in the soil of England". Gower described certain standard English words with nonstandard pronunciations in the Surrey dialect:

Surrey grammatical features

Gowers mentions:

Acrost for across; agoo for ago; batcheldor for bachelor; brownchitis (or sometime brown titus) for bronchitis; chimley or chimbley for chimney; crowner for coroner; crowner's quest for coroner's inquest; curosity and curous for curiosity and curious; death for deaf; disgest for digest, and indisgestion for indigestion; gownd for gown; scholard for scholar; nevvy for nephew; non-plush'd for non-plussed; refuge for refuse; quid for cud, " chewing the quid; "sarment for sermon; varmint for vermin; sloop for slope; spartacles for spectacles; spavin for spasms. I knew an old woman who was constantly suffering from "the windy spavin;" taters for potatoes; wunst for once; wuts for oats, etc., etc."

Syntax of the Surrey dialect included:

- The Old and Middle English prefix of "a-" is used generally before substantives, before participles and with adjectives placed after nouns, e.g., a-coming, a-going, a-plenty, a-many.
- Double negatives in a sentence are common, "You don't know nothing", "The gent ain't going to give us nothing"
- "be" is common for "are", e.g., "How be you?" is noted, to which "I be pretty middlin', thank ye" was the usual answer.
- Superlatives (+est) were used in place of the word "most", e.g., "the impudentest man I ever see"
- "You've no ought" was the equivalent of "you should not"
- "See" was used for saw (the preterite usually past simple) of see
- "Grow'd," "know'd," "see'd," "throw'd," and similar were however also used both for the perfect and participle passive of the verbs, e.g., "I've know'd a litter of seven whelps reared in that hole"
- Past participle takes more complex forms after common consonants "-ded," "-ted," e.g., attackted, drownded, "Such a country as this, where everything is either scorched up with the sun or drownded with the rain."
- The pleonastic use of "-like" denoting "vaguely", e.g. comfortable-like, timid-like, dazed-like, "I have felt lonesome-like ever since."
- "all along of" meaning "because of"
Surrey lexical features
- bait – an afternoon meal about 4 pm
- bannick – a verb meaning to beat or thrash
- baulky – is said of a person who tries to avoid you
- beazled – tired
- beatle – a mallet
- befront – in front of
- beleft – the participle of "believe"
- bettermost – upper-class people
- bly – a likeness, "he has a bly of his father"
- burden – a quantity
- comb – the moss that grows on church bells
- clung – moist or damp grass
- dryth – drought
- fail – a verb meaning to fall ill
- fly-golding – a ladybird
- foundrous – boggy or marshy
- gratten – stubble left in a field after harvest
- hem – a lot or much
- hot – a verb meaning to heat something up, "hot it over the fire"
- innardly – to talk innardly is to mumble
- leastways – otherwise
- lief – rather, "I'd lief not"
- lippy – rude
- market fresh – drunk
- messengers – small clouds (also called "water dogs")
- middlin – reasonable or average
- mixen – a heap of dung or soil
- mothery – mouldy
- notation – making a fuss
- nurt – a verb meaning to entice
- ornary – being unwell (the word means "ordinary")
- peart – brisk or lively
- picksome – pretty or dainty
- platty – uneven
- quirk – a faint noise indicating fear
- runagate – good for nothing
- sauce – vegetables, e.g. "green sauce", pronounced "soss"
- scrow – a verb to scowl
- shatter – sprinkling
- shifty – untidy
- shuckish – unsettled, showery weather
- snob – shoemaker
- spoon meat – soup
- statesman – landowner
- stood – stuck
- swimy – giddy
- the big smoke – London
- tidy – adjective meaning good or well
- timmersome – timid
- uppards – towards London or in the north
- venturesome – brave
- welt – scorched
- wift – quick

=== Sussex ===
The traditional Sussex accent shows the above features, namely including rhoticity, an extremely narrow PRICE vowel, and Cockney-like th-stopping. Reduplicated plural forms were a grammatical feature of the Sussex dialect, particularly in words ending -st, such as ghostesses in place of the standard English ghosts. Many old Sussex words once existed, thought to have derived from Sussex's fishermen and their links with fishermen from the coasts of France and the Netherlands. A universal feminine gender pronoun was typical, reflected in a joking saying in Sussex that "Everything in Sussex is a she except a tomcat and she's a he."

== See also ==
- Australian English – Set of varieties of English language
- Falkland Islands English – Variety of the English language spoken in the Falkland Islands
- New Zealand English – Variant of English language
- Regional accents of English
- South African English – Variety of the English language
- Zimbabwean English – Set of varieties of the English language native to Zimbabwe
