= Parish Pump (CGA series) =

1970s series of magazine articles

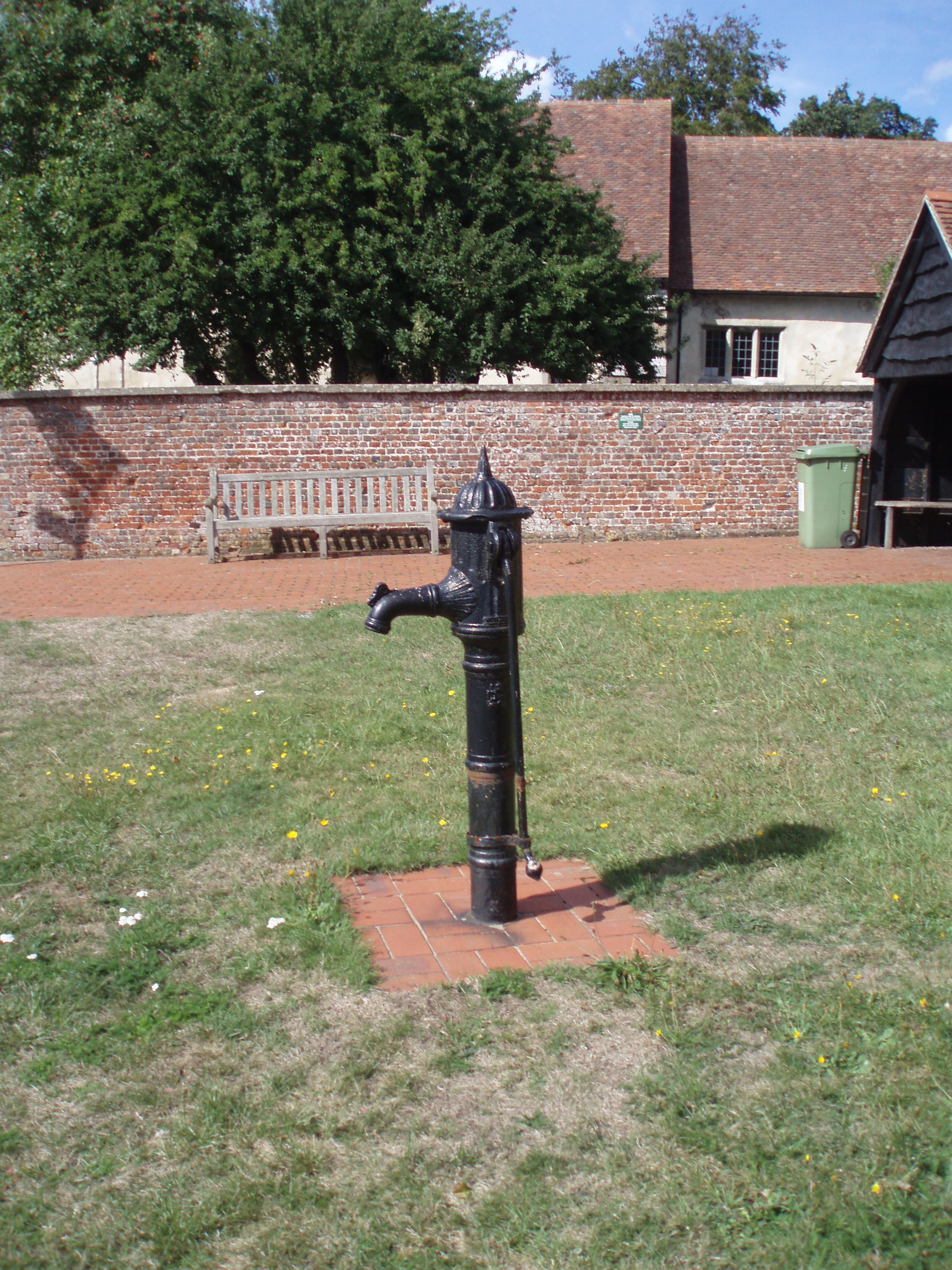
A typical Parish Pump

Parish Pump was a series of articles that ran between January 1971 and September 1975 in The Country Gentleman's Association monthly magazine. Written by Julian Grey, the articles detailed life in a fictional East Anglian village between the 1930s and the 1970s.

== Brief overview ==
"Ancient men full of guile, bigotry and craftsmanship supping from chipped mugs at an ancient settle, they are long gone. No Parish Pump remains the same forever, and ours - like all the others - has had to change with the times." (Jan 72)

Grey is a writer and a townie, and as such is initially viewed with much suspicion by the mainly agrarian natives when he arrives in 1937. However, over time he is accepted as a harmless, if dilettante, member of the community. He brings his family up and sees the village change as technology and social change reach the depths of the countryside.

== Location ==
The centre of the drama is unnamed, but referred to as the community around the Parish Pump. This is one of three satellite hamlets surrounding the more dominant Greater Seething. They in turn feed into a market town called Steepleborough (May 1975). A parish council still exists

Within the village

- The Parish Church, dedicated to St Mary, the Blessed Virgin (August 1973)
- One Non-Conformist Chapel ( Sept 75)
- The Village Hall (May 72)
- A post office ( Jan 73)
- An unadopted spur, Watchitt Green (May 72)
- Poacher's Wood ( Oct 75)
- The Greensward (Jan 71; passim)
- none of which approach in importance the true hub of the community, The Star and Wheelbarrow

== Dramatis Personnae ==
Name	Brief description	Episode
Ossie Badger	Local poacher	Oct 75
P.C. Barter	Village Bobby	Jul 75
Old Mrs Barter	Village nag	Mar 74
Myrt Bilbury	Schoolgirl	Sep 72
Susan Bilbury	Grey’s new cleaner	Jun 73
Bert Billings	Love rival	Jan 74
Caleb Bingham	Local farmer	Mar 73
Corky Carter	Aged villager	Nov 74
Joseph Crane	Oldest resident	Nov 74
Barney Dean	Ex G.I.	Jul 75
Bob Grudging	Village timekeeper	Apr 73
Mrs Grisby	Wealthy widow	Nov 71
The Hartley Hales	Wealthy arristves	Mar 71
The Hollidays	Eccentric architects	Jun 73
Jasper Horncastle	Hall Secretary	May 72
George Laycroft	Smallholder	Mar 73
Maureen McGinty	Irish maid	Sep 74
Len Milliken	Village handyman	Jul 72
Jasper Pettigrew	Dandified roadman	Apr 73
Alfred Porson	Clive’s Grandfather	Aug 73
Clive Porson	Solicitor	Aug 73
Dave Porson	Father of Clive	Aug 73
Cyril Podger	Hypocondriac	May 75
Amos Pilling	Gambler	Sep 72
Rosie Randall	Mother of 6	Mar 72
Ken Sparrow	Gamekeeper	Oct 75
Henry Stobbs	Thatcher	Nov 73
Maureen Stray	Village beauty	Aug 75
Sarah Stray	Mother of Maureen	Aug 75
Shiner Sparrow	Love rival	Jan 74
Marigold Upson	Grey’s 1st cleaner	May 73
Dr Wilkinson	Traditional medic	May 75

Unnamed characters These include

- The Squire: a distant and unobtrusive patriarch
- The General: retired Indian army with obligatory Labrador in tow
- The Vicar: earnest muscular Christian
- a Planter from Burma, and his wife
- The Editor of a Fine Arts Magazine
- A Hungarian lorrydriver
- Two drunk servicemen

== Plot Summaries ==
The series ran from bi-monthly in 1971 and 72; then again in 1974 and 75; in 1973 a shorter, but monthly, article, appeared.

1971

- Jan pages 6 to 9: Introductory article - why strong walls make good neighbours
- Mar p95-97: An exotic London couple make their homes in the village
- Jul p275-277: Grey spars with his taciturn, obstinate gardener
- Sep p368-370: Deadly intrigue at the Horticultural Show
- Nov p445-447: A widow plans to sell a small meadow for development

1972

- Jan p9-11: A description of the village's original 3 pubs, now reduced to 1
- Mar p83-86: the uses the thriving village hall is put to
- May p148-151: The unadopted part of the village lobbies to be incorporated
- Jul p213-226: the village handyman is departing, much to everyone's dismay
- Sep p303-306: a local bachelor strikes lucky at the local races
- Nov p 453-456: The Sunday Newspaper "Boy" ( aged 86) retires

1973

- Jan p14-15: The Post Office Noticeboard
- Feb p74-75: A tenant farmer is selling up
- Mar p144-146: Mid week routines
- Apr p210-212: A new pub sign is universally disliked
- May p270-272: The Grey's faithful "Lady that does" quits
- Jun p338-340: A popular local "Beatt Combo" split
- Jul p400-402: The growing "Week-enders" trend
- Aug p464-465: A young Scion marries into money
- Sep p535-537: The Cricketing feats of yesteryear
- Oct p593-595: Organised poaching gangs visit at night
- Nov p656-658: A thatcher refuses to take no for an answer
- Dec p726-728: The new vicar causes concern

1974

- Jan p10-12: How Grey moved in one frosty New Year's Eve
- Mar p149-151: A portrait of the General
- May p272-274: A Hungarian tractor driver is well and truly lost
- July p385-387: An exact repeat (although not acknowledged) of the July 1973 article
- Sept p540-542: An Irish girl comes to work at the Grey's
- Nov p659-661: Two old comrades refuse to walk a quarter of a mile to see one another

1975

- Jan p14-16: Two very different soldiers are stranded in the village on New Year's Eve
- Mar p149-151: The pub's ancient settle is removed to make way for a fruit machine
- May p269-271: A portrait of the village's charismatic former G.P
- July p394-396: A former G.I. settles in the village and tweaks some time-honoured customs
- Sept p486-488: A description of the rivalry between the village and its larger neighbour

"There is no great amity, just a polite acceptance of the other's existence." (Sept 75)
