= Allan Smethurst =

English folk singer and postman

- Also known as: The Singing Postman
- Born: Allan Francis Smethurst; 19 November 1927; Walshaw, Lancashire, England
- Died: 22 December 2000 (aged 73) Grimsby, Lincolnshire, England
- Genres: Folk, novelty
- Occupations: Singer, postman
- Years active: 1960s–1970
- Label: EMI

Allan Francis Smethurst (19 November 1927 – 22 December 2000), aka The Singing Postman was an English folk singer and postman. He is best known for his self-penned novelty song "Hev Yew Gotta Loight, Boy?", which earned him an Ivor Novello Award in 1966, “Come Along A Me” and "A Miss from Diss". The Guardian dubbed him a "bookishly melancholy folk-satirist".

== Life and career ==
Born in Walshaw, near Bury, Lancashire, the son of Allan and Gladys Mabel (née Curson), Smethurst was raised in Sheringham, Norfolk, from the age of 11. His mother came from the village of Stiffkey, 15 miles to the west. It is often thought that he became a postman in Lavenham, Suffolk, but photos of him in the area are just promotional material. Smethurst joined the Post Office in 1953, and later worked in Grimsby. He never worked for the GPO in Norfolk or Suffolk.

Smethurst hummed tunes on his daily post round for 12 years, writing and singing songs in his characteristic Norfolk dialect. An audition tape sent to the BBC earned him a spot on Ralph Tuck's BBC East regional radio programme Wednesday Morning. His popularity led to Tuck recording Smethurst on his own record label, ‘The Smallest Recording Organisation in the World’, based in Lowestoft. A four-track EP containing his signature tune “Hev Yew Gotta Loight Boy”, made the EP charts in 1965. This was followed by another EP release by Ralph Tuck, and an album The Singing Postman's Year. He was then signed to EMI who re-released earlier songs and recorded new items. A colour promotional film was made of “Hev Yew Gotta Loight Boy” which has survived to this day. He made numerous live and promotional performances, including on Top of the Pops, but was afflicted by nerves and stage fright. His live performances included a summer season in 1965 at the Windmill Theatre in Great Yarmouth.

In 1966, the Singing Postman's best known hit "Hev Yew Gotta Loight, Boy?" won Smethurst the Ivor Novello Award for best novelty song of the year. Rolf Harris recorded a cover version without success. The song had a small comeback in 1994, when it was featured on a television commercial for Ovaltine. It was also covered by punk band Splodgenessabounds in 1981.

Smethurst left the music industry in 1970 citing stage fright and arthritic hands. He later admitted to an alcohol problem and revealed all his earnings were gone and he was penniless. He spent his last 20 years living quietly in a Salvation Army hostel in Grimsby, where he died from a heart attack in December 2000. He was cremated at Grimsby Crematorium.

In September 2010, a BBC Radio 4 programme, In Search of the Singing Postman was broadcast; it was written and presented by D. J. Taylor.

== Discography ==
=== Albums ===
- The Singing Postman's Year (RTP, 1966)

Side one
No.	Title	Length
1.	"January Sales"
2.	"Suffin' Cold"
3.	"Spring Cleaning"
4.	"Wass The Bottum Dropped Owt?"
5.	"Hev Yew Gotta Loight, Boy?"
6.	"The Cricket Match"

Side two
No.	Title	Length
7.	"Are Yew Alroight, Boy?"
8.	"Followin' The Boinder Round"
9.	"The Mystery Of Owld Tom's Grave"
10.	"On The Night Of Halloween"
11.	"Charlie In The Winta Toime"
12.	"The Postman's Lament"

- Recorded Delivery (Parlophone, 1966)
- The Sound Barrier (Parlophone, 1967)

Side one
No.	Title	Length
1.	"Sound Barrier"
2.	"Devils Hoof Prints"
3.	"Dew Yer Father Keep A Dickie"
4.	"February Lady"
5.	"1776"
6.	"First World War"

Side two
No.	Title	Length
7.	"Old Tom Tide"
8.	"Labour On Principle"
9.	"Poacher's Lament"
10.	"Wroxham Broad"
11.	"Tommy Dack"
12.	"What Yew On Holiday"

- The Best of the Singing Postman (Starline, 1967)
- First Class Male (1971, Gemini)
- Hev Yew Gotta Loight, Boy? (Parlophone, 2005)

=== Singles and EPs ===
- "First Delivery EP" (EMI, 1966)
- "Second Delivery EP" (Parlophone, 1966)
- "Third Delivery EP" (Parlophone, 1966)
- "Fourth Delivery EP" (Parlophone, 1966)
- "Ladies Darts Team" / "Roundabout" (Parlophone, 1966)
- "Mind How You Go" (Parlophone, 1967)
- "Please Mr. Postman" (Parlophone, 1967)
- "Fertilising Lisa" / "Ballad of A Ten Bob Note" (President PVK.005, 1977)
- "Hey the Bottom Dropped Owt" (Ralph Tuck, 1997)

== See also ==
- John Prine, American singer-songwriter and former Chicago mailman
