= East Anglia =

Region of England

Coordinates: 52.5°N 1°E

- Region
- Flag
- Etymology: Kingdom of the East Angles
- East Anglia: with the ceremonial counties of Norfolk and Suffolk (in red) to the north and south and Cambridgeshire and Essex (in pink) to the west
- Sovereign state: United Kingdom
- Country: England
- Region: East of England
- Largest city: Peterborough
- Ceremonial counties: Norfolk; Suffolk; Cambridgeshire (occasionally); Essex (sometimes)

East Anglia (/ˈæŋ.ɡli.ə/) is a geographical area in the East of England. The area is not clearly defined, and various definitions consider different English counties to be a part of it. Almost all definitions of East Anglia include the counties of Norfolk and Suffolk, with many additionally including Cambridgeshire and Essex, and a few expanding to include more or all of the East of England. Until 2025, the Office for National Statistics defined a statistical region called "East Anglia," which covered the counties of Norfolk, Suffolk and Cambridgeshire.

The name "East Anglia" derives from the Anglo-Saxon kingdom of the East Angles, a people whose name originated in Anglia (Angeln), in what is now the Schleswig-Holstein state of Northern Germany bordering Denmark.

East Anglia is a predominantly rural region and contains mainly flat or low-lying and agricultural land. The area is known for considerable natural beauty, sharing a long North Sea coastline, and The Broads (known for marketing purposes as The Broads National Park). Norwich is the principal settlement and historical capital of the region.

== Area ==
Definitions of what constitutes East Anglia vary. The Anglo-Saxon Kingdom of East Anglia, established in the 6th century, originally consisted of the modern counties of Norfolk and Suffolk and expanded west into at least part of Cambridgeshire, typically the northernmost parts known as The Fens. The former NUTS 2 statistical unit of East Anglia comprised Norfolk, Suffolk and Cambridgeshire (including the City of Peterborough unitary authority), until 2025 when the East Anglia unit was split up into three ITL 2 (previously NUTS 2) units covering each county. Those three counties have formed the Roman Catholic Diocese of East Anglia since 1976, and were the subject of a possible government devolution package in 2016.

Essex has sometimes been included in definitions of East Anglia, including by the London Society of East Anglians. (Note: The First World War memorial at Liverpool Street Station, erected by the London Society of East Anglians, is "to the men of Norfolk, Suffolk, Essex and Cambridgeshire".) Although the Kingdom of Essex to the south was a separate element of the heptarchy of Anglo-Saxon England and did not identify as Angles but Saxons, many people in Essex today still consider themselves to be East Anglian. For example, Colchester United F.C. is one of the clubs competing for the informal football title Pride of Anglia, but not Southend United F.C. from further south in the county. Culturally, north Essex has much more in common with Suffolk and the rest of East Anglia due to its similar rural landscape, when compared to the south which is much more urban given its proximity to London. However, the county of Essex by itself forms a NUTS 2 statistical unit in the East of England region. Although since 2025, Norfolk and Suffolk are also separate ITL 2 (previously NUTS 2) units.

Great Britain around the year 800 showing the East Angles

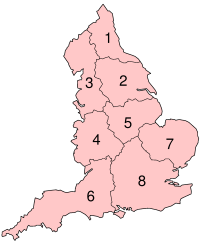
Redcliffe-Maud proposed provinces; East Anglia is marked 7

Other definitions of the area have been used or proposed over the years. For example, the Redcliffe-Maud Report in 1969, which followed the Royal Commission on the Reform of Local Government, recommended the creation of eight provinces in England. The proposed East Anglia province would have included northern Essex, southern Lincolnshire and a small part of Northamptonshire as well as Cambridgeshire, Norfolk and Suffolk.

=== Cultural identity ===
Despite being considered by some to be a sub-region of the East of England, it is considered to have its own differing cultural identity and characteristics, with some considering it an informal region in its own right. It has more distinct accents within the area compared to the rest of the East of England region, such as the Norfolk and Suffolk accents. It is also considered a less commercialised area, with more agricultural business being based within East Anglia. However, several areas of East Anglia are starting to experience a renaissance, with more frequent decentralisation and expansions of certain businesses taking place in several areas such as the recent introductions of commercial businesses such as Taco Bell and Odeon Cinemas into areas of East Anglia. However, despite a recent economic renaissance, East Anglia is also still a poorer area than the rest of the East of England region, with several areas suffering from intense deprivation and poverty.

From a geographical perspective, East Anglia also differs hugely from the rest of the East of England due to it being somewhat situated on the east coast of England, leading to several seaside towns being situated within the area. A more noticeable differing geographical feature is The Fens, an area of low-lying marshland populated throughout East Anglia as well as, to a lesser extent, the East Midlands. It has managed to define East Anglia, especially from a historical perspective, and help it stand out from the rest of the East of England, with several plans recently set up to restore The Fens to its initial state, prior to its drainage, as a big wetland area. East Anglia is also more likely than any other area in the East of England to be considered part of the Midlands. This is mostly because East Anglia's geographical location aligns with The Midlands. It is also likely due to several areas of East Anglia being situated above or on several somewhat common but unofficial borders that separate the Midlands and even the North in some cases, from Southern England such as River Great Ouse, River Nene or even the Thames. East Anglia and the Midlands were also previously combined in a grouping known as "Central England" based on European Parliament constituencies in the United Kingdom. Similarly, some East Anglian citizens have expressed interests in turning East Anglia into its own independent state.

== History ==
The kingdom of East Anglia initially consisted of Norfolk and Suffolk, but the Isle of Ely also became part of it upon the marriage of East Anglian princess Æthelthryth (Etheldreda). It may have been formed around 520 by merging the North and South Folk, Angles who had settled in the former lands of the Iceni during the previous century, and it was one of the Anglo-Saxon heptarchy kingdoms as defined in the 12th-century writings of Henry of Huntingdon. East Anglia has been cited by a number of scholars as being a region where settlement of continental Germanic speakers was particularly early and dense, possibly following a depopulation in the 4th century.

A 2016 study found that modern East Anglians share a strong genetic affinity with Anglo-Saxon era skeletons, but differ substantially from Iron Age and Roman era ones, which are more similar to the Welsh. This was taken to support a major influence of the Anglo-Saxon migrations on the genetic makeup of East Anglia. In a 2022 study by Joscha Gretzinger et al., the populations of Norfolk and Suffolk were found to be the group with the lowest amount of Iron Age/Roman period British Isles-related ancestry, with only about 11–12.7% of their ancestry being derived from that group, while having one of the highest amounts of Continental North European (45.9–46.1%), and the highest amount of Continental West European (41.2–43.1%) ancestry in all of England.

East Anglia was the most powerful of the kingdoms of Anglo-Saxon England for a brief period following a victory over the rival kingdom of Northumbria around 616, and its King Rædwald was Bretwalda (overlord of the Anglo-Saxon kingdoms). Just before this point East Anglia started becoming Christian. However, this did not last; the Mercians defeated it twice over the next 40 years, and East Anglia continued to weaken in relation to the other kingdoms. Offa of Mercia finally had king Æthelberht killed in 794 and took control of the kingdom himself. Independence was temporarily restored by rebellion in 825, but the Danes killed King Edmund on 20 November 869 and captured the kingdom. Edward the Elder incorporated East Anglia into the Kingdom of England, and it later became an earldom.

The Anglo-Saxon Chronicles make reference to East Anglian military hero Ulfcytel, first described for his attempts to ward off an attack by the Danes in 1004. The Norwegian court poet Sigvatr Þórðarson called all of East Anglia "Ulfkell's land" (Ulfcytel's land), named for the military leader.

Parts of East Anglia remained marshland until the 17th-century drainage of the Fens, despite some earlier engineering work during the Roman occupation. The alluvial land was converted into wide swaths of productive arable land by a series of systematic drainage projects, mainly using drains and river diversions along the lines of Dutch practice. In the 1630s, thousands of Puritan families from East Anglia emigrated to New England in America, taking much East Anglian culture with them that can still be traced today. East Anglia based much of its earnings on wool, textiles, and arable farming and was a rich area of England until the Industrial Revolution caused a manufacturing and development shift to the Midlands and the North.

During the Second World War, the Royal Air Force and the United States Army Air Force constructed many airbases in East Anglia for the heavy bomber fleets of the Combined Bomber Offensive against German-occupied Europe. East Anglia was ideally suited to airfield construction, as it includes large areas of open, level terrain and is close to mainland Europe. Many of the airfields can still be seen today, particularly from aerial photographs, and a few remain in use, the most prominent being Norwich International Airport. Pillboxes were erected in 1940 to help defend the nation against invasion, and they can also be found throughout the area at strategic points. Similarly, but from the Napoleonic Wars, a number of Martello towers can be found along the coast.

== Geography ==
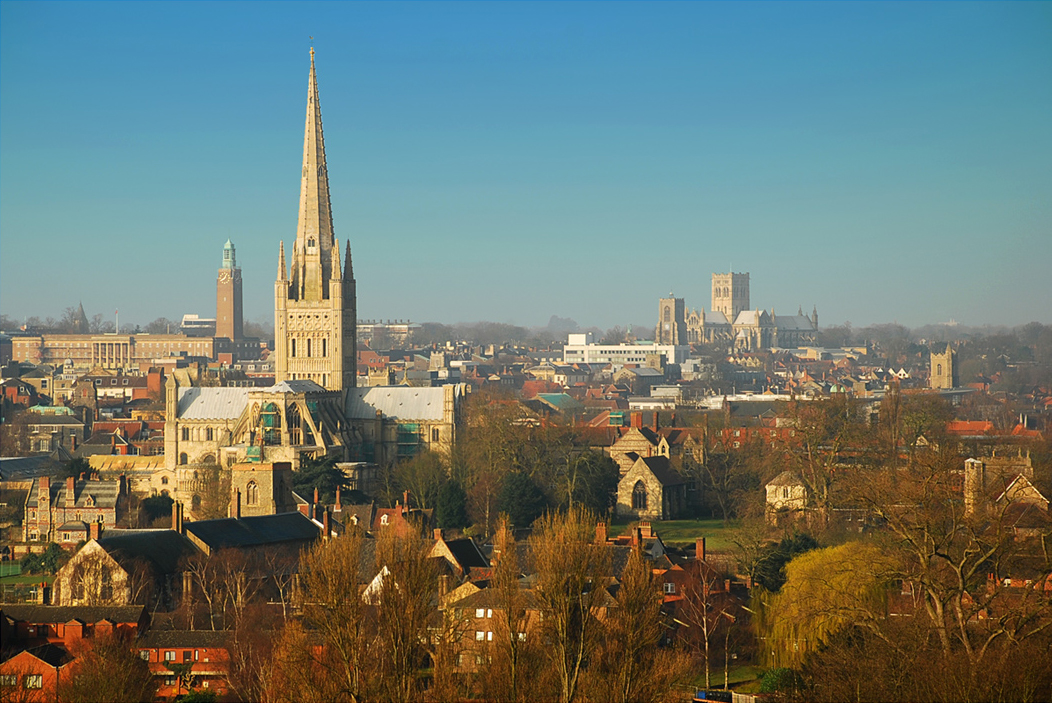
Norwich, with an urban population of 230,822, is the largest settlement in East Anglia.

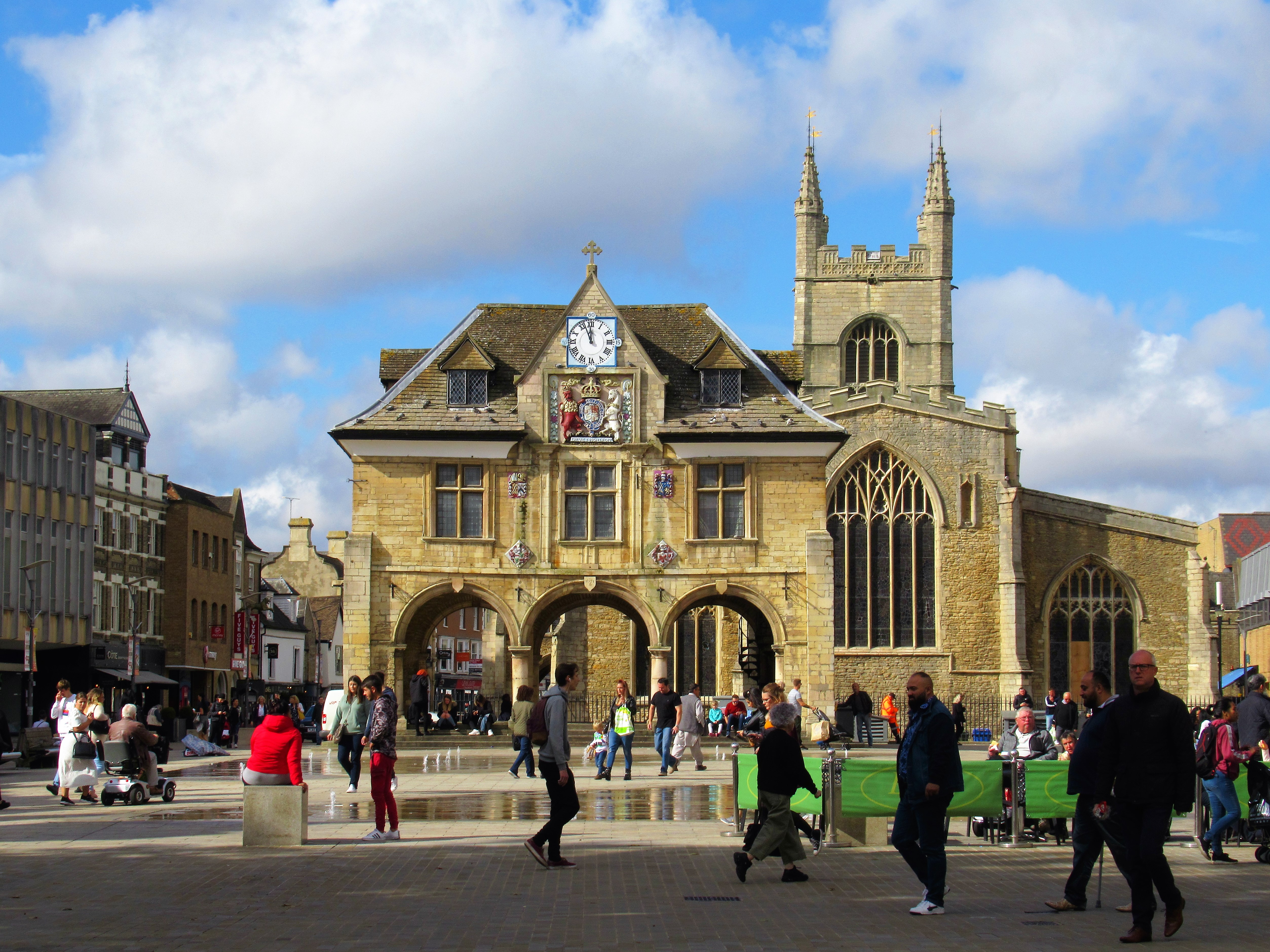
Peterborough, with an urban population of 217,000, is the second largest settlement in East Anglia.

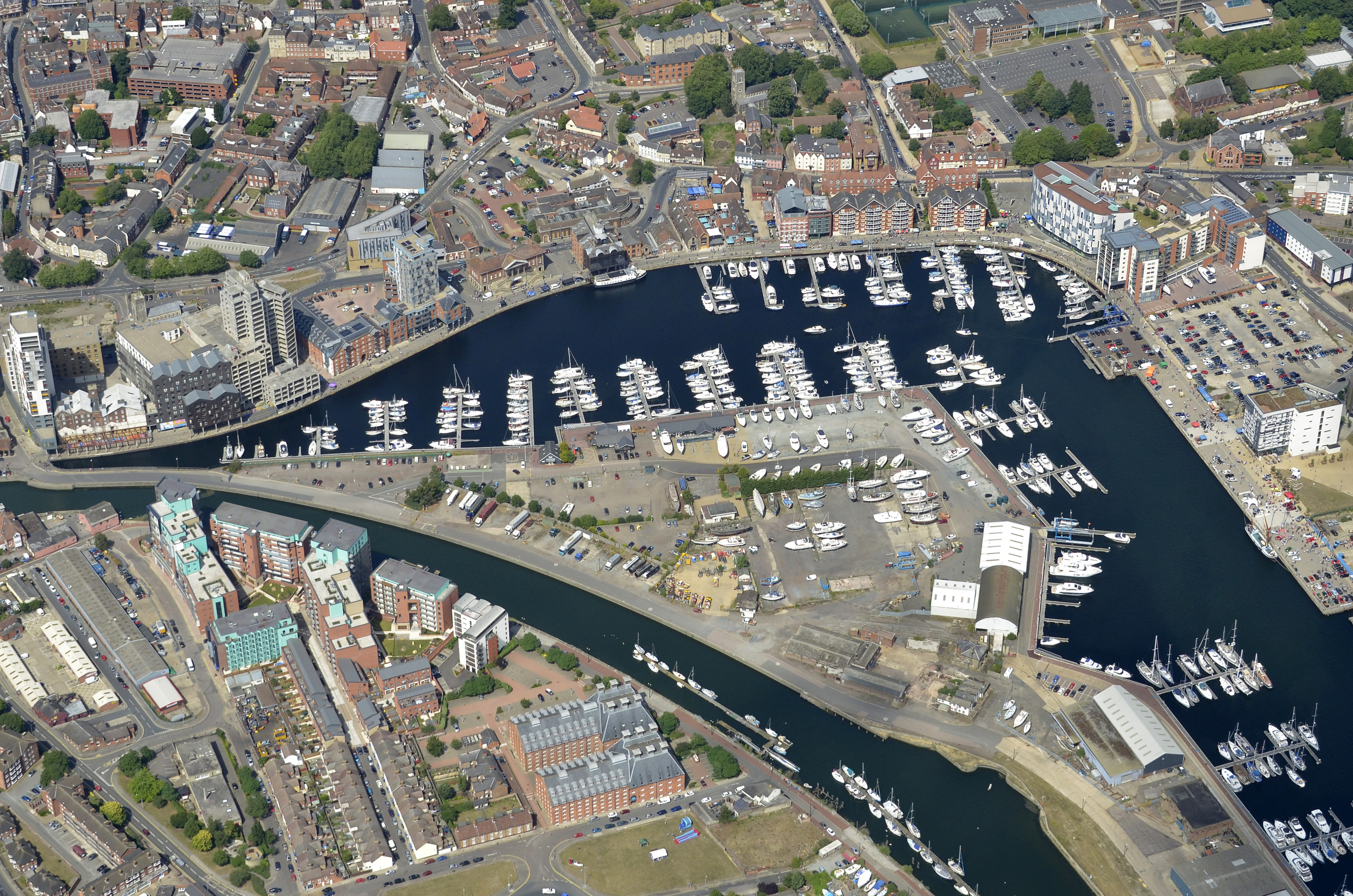
Ipswich, with an urban population of 180,000, is the third largest settlement in East Anglia.

East Anglia is bordered to the north and east by the North Sea, to the south by the estuaries of the rivers Orwell and Stour, and shares an undefined land border to the west with the rest of England. Much of northern East Anglia is flat, low-lying and marshy (such as the Fens of Cambridgeshire and Norfolk), although the extensive drainage projects of the past centuries actually make this one of the driest areas in the UK. Inland, much of the rest of Suffolk and Norfolk is gently undulating, with glacial moraine ridges providing some areas of steeper relief. The highest point in Norfolk is the 103 metres (338 ft) Beacon Hill; the supposed flatness of Norfolk is noted in literature, including Noël Coward's Private Lives – "Very flat, Norfolk".

On the north-west corner East Anglia is bordered by a bay known as The Wash, where owing to deposits of sediment and land reclamation, the coastline has altered markedly within historical times; several towns once on the coast of the Wash (notably King's Lynn) are now some distance inland. Conversely, over to the east on the coast exposed to the North Sea the coastline is subject to rapid erosion and has shifted inland significantly since historic times.

Major rivers include the Nene and the Stour, running through country beloved of the painter John Constable. The River Cam is a tributary of the Great Ouse and gives its name to Cambridge, whilst Norwich sits on the River Yare and River Wensum. The River Orwell flows through Ipswich and has its mouth, along with the Stour, at Felixstowe. The Norfolk and Suffolk Broads form a network of waterways between Norwich and the coast and are popular for recreational boating. The Ouse flows into the Wash at King's Lynn.

Major urban areas in East Anglia include the cities of Norwich, Cambridge and Peterborough, and the town of Ipswich. Other towns and cities include Bury St Edmunds, Ely, Lowestoft, Great Yarmouth, King's Lynn, and Newmarket. Much of the area is still rural in nature with many villages surrounded by a mixture of breckland, fens, broads and agricultural land.

=== Climate ===
The climate of East Anglia is generally dry and mild. Temperatures range from an average of 1–10 °C in the winter to 12–22 °C in the summer, although it is not uncommon for daily temperatures to fall and rise significantly outside these averages. Although water plays a significant role in the Fenland and Broadland landscapes, the area is among the driest in the United Kingdom and during the summer months, tinder-dry conditions are frequently experienced, occasionally resulting in field and heath fires. Many areas receive less than 700 mm of rainfall a year and this is fairly evenly distributed throughout the year. Sunshine totals tend to be higher towards the coastal areas.

== Transport ==
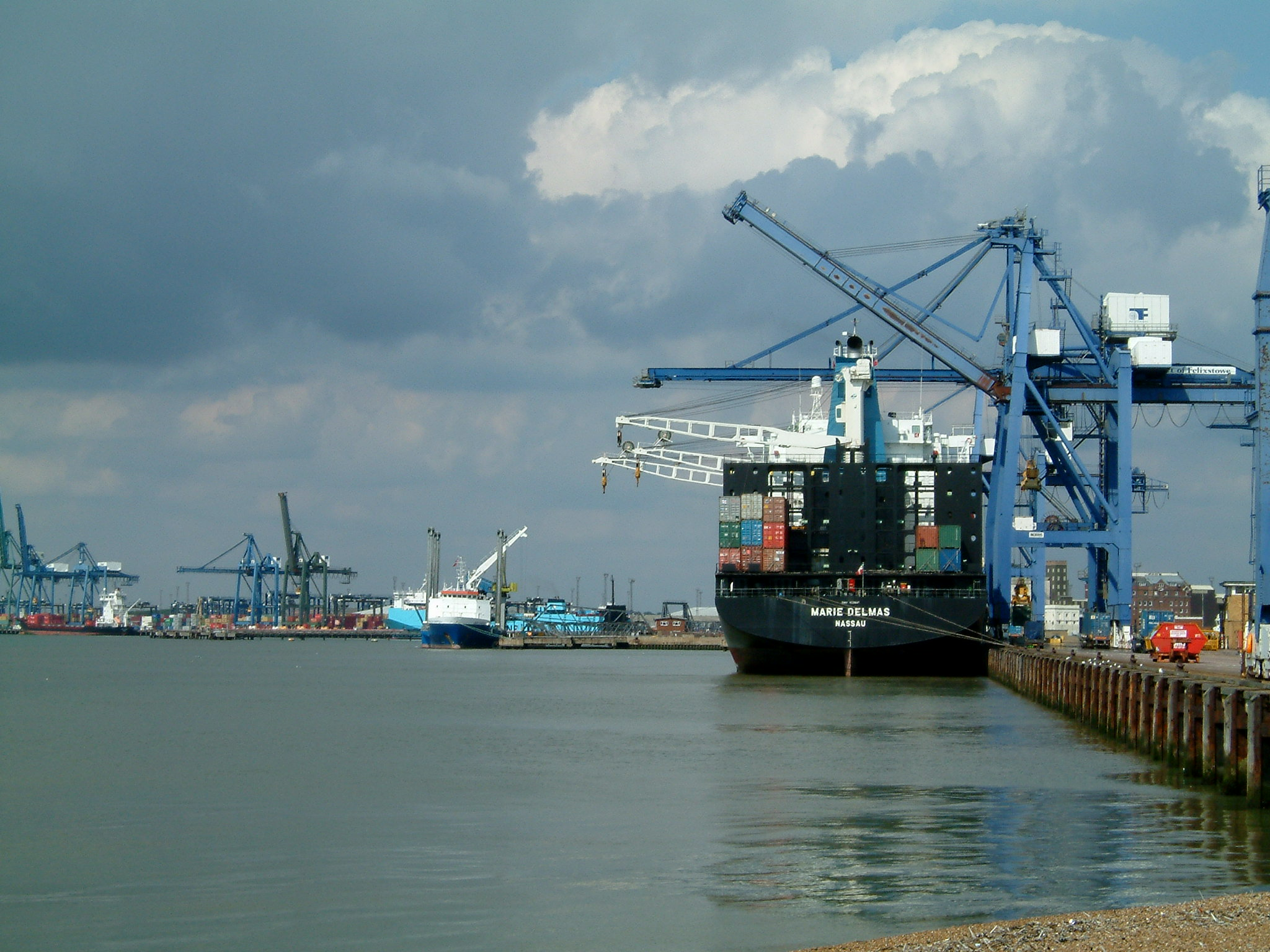
Port of Felixstowe – Landguard Terminal in the foreground with Trinity Terminal in the background

Transport in East Anglia consists of an extensive road and rail network. Main A roads, such as the A12 and A47 link the area to the rest of the UK, and the A14 links the Midlands to the Port of Felixstowe. This is the busiest container port in the UK, dealing with over 40% of UK container traffic and is a major gateway port into the country. There is very little motorway within East Anglia.

Rail links include the Great Eastern Main Line from Norwich to London Liverpool Street and the West Anglia Main Line connecting Cambridge to London. Sections of the East Coast Main Line run through the area and Peterborough is an important interchange on this line. The area is linked to the Midlands and north-west England by rail and has a number of local rail services, such as the Bittern Line from Norwich to Sheringham.

East Anglia is ideal for cycling and National Cycle Route 1 passes through it. Cambridge has the largest proportion of its residents in the UK cycling to work with 25% commuting by bicycle. The city is also home to the Cambridgeshire Guided Busway, which at 13.3 miles (21.4 km) was the longest stretch of guided bus-way in the world when it opened in 2011.

The only major commercial airport is Norwich Airport, although London Stansted Airport, the fourth busiest passenger airport in the UK, lies just south of Cambridge in north-west Essex.

== Universities ==
The University of Cambridge, established at the start of the 13th century and in the town of the same name, is East Anglia's best-known institution of higher learning and is among the oldest and most famous universities in the world. Other institutions include the University of East Anglia (in Norwich), University of Essex, Norwich University of the Arts, Anglia Ruskin University (based in Cambridge), University of Suffolk (based in Ipswich) and University Centre Peterborough.

== Enterprise zones ==
Great Yarmouth and Lowestoft Enterprise Zone, an enterprise zone initiated by New Anglia Local Enterprise Partnership, was announced in 2011 and launched in April 2012. It includes six sites with a total area of 121 hectares (300 acres), which have attracted a number of energy-related businesses. The sites are Beacon Park and South Denes in Great Yarmouth, Mobbs Way, Riverside Road and South Lowestoft Industrial Estate in Lowestoft and Ellough Business Park in Ellough near Beccles. There is also an enterprise zone in Cambridgeshire, Alconbury Enterprise Campus in Huntingdon.

== Symbols and culture ==
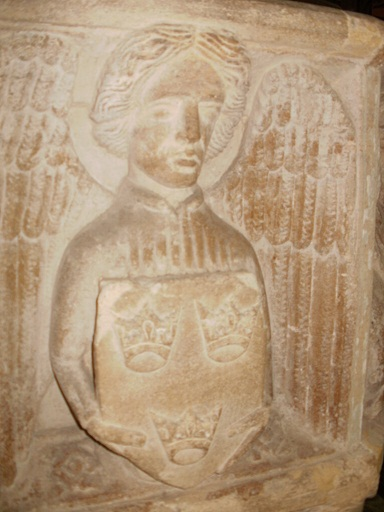
Three crowns emblem at Saxmundham's parish church

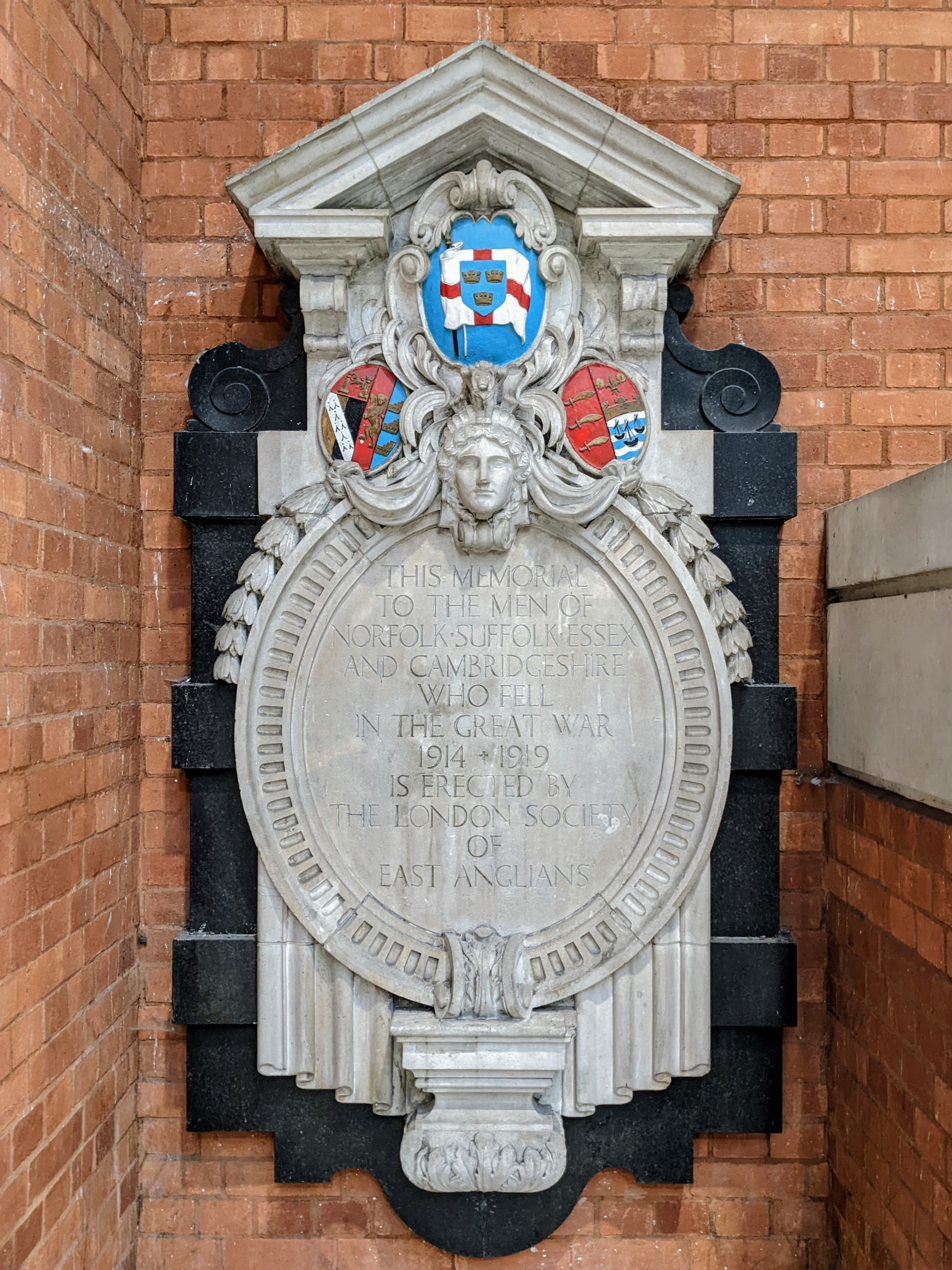
Memorial in Liverpool Street Station to East Anglians who died during the First World War. The memorial, erected by the London Society of East Anglians, displays the flag

A shield of three golden crowns, placed two above one, on a blue background has been used as a symbol of East Anglia for centuries. The coat of arms was ascribed by medieval heralds to the Anglo-Saxon Kingdom of East Anglia and the Wuffingas dynasty which ruled it. The arms are effectively identical to the coat of arms of Sweden.

The three crowns appear, carved in stone, on the baptismal font (c.1400) in the parish church of Saxmundham, and on the 15th-century porch of Woolpit church, both in Suffolk. They also appear in local heraldry and form part of the arms of the diocese of Ely and the arms of the borough of Bury St Edmunds, where the crowns are shown pierced with arrows to represent the martyrdom of Edmund the Martyr, the last king of East Anglia. Other users of the arms include the former Isle of Ely County Council, the Borough of Colchester and the University of East Anglia. The flag of Cambridgeshire (adopted in 2015) includes the three gold crowns on a blue field.

The East Anglian flag as it is known today was proposed by George Henry Langham and adopted in 1902 by the London Society of East Anglians (established in 1896). It superimposes the three crowns in a blue shield on a Saint George's Cross.

East Anglia features heavily in English literature, notably in Noël Coward's Private Lives and the history of its waterways and drainage forms the backdrop to Graham Swift's 1983 novel Waterland. The area also figures in works by L.P. Hartley, Arthur Ransome and Dorothy L. Sayers, among many others.

"Suffolk pink" and similar pastel colours of whitewash are commonly seen on houses in Suffolk, Norfolk and their neighbouring counties.

== Tourism ==
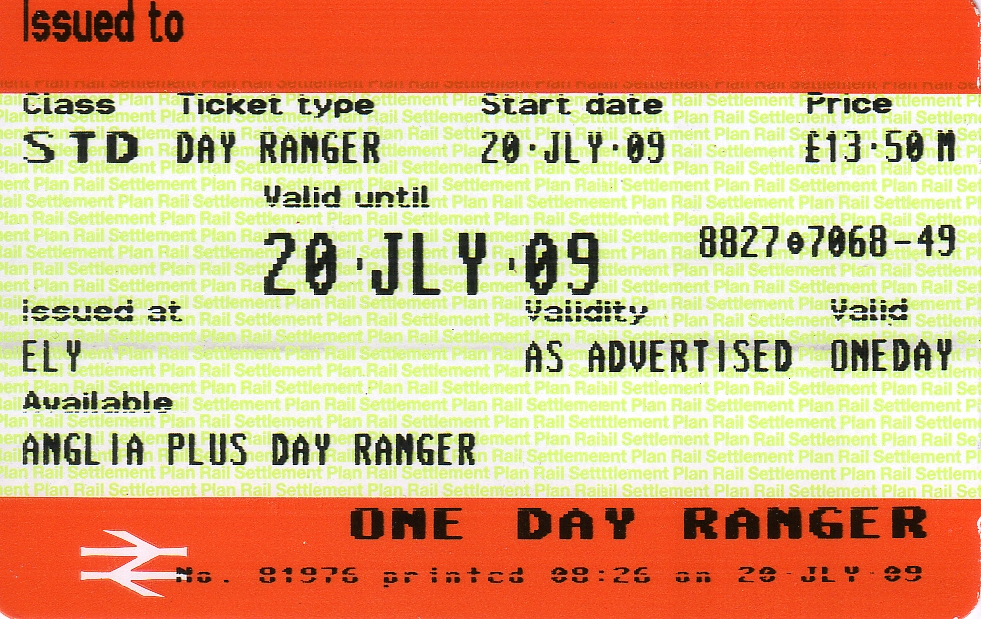
Anglia day ranger travel card

East Anglia has holiday resorts that range from the traditional coastal towns of Felixstowe and Lowestoft in Suffolk and Great Yarmouth and Hunstanton in Norfolk, to towns like Aldeburgh and Southwold in Suffolk. Other tourist attractions include historic towns and cities like Bury St Edmunds, Cambridge and Ely as well as areas such as Constable Country, the Broads and the North Norfolk coast.

== See also ==
- Earl of East Anglia
- East Anglian English
- Historical and alternative regions of England
- List of monarchs of East Anglia
- Middle Angles
- Parish Pump (CGA series)
- Royal Anglian Regiment
- Diocese of East Anglia
