= Peter Trudgill =

English sociolinguist (born 1943)

- Born: 7 November 1943 (age 82); Norwich

Academic background
- Education: City of Norwich School
- Alma mater: King's College, Cambridge; University of Edinburgh

Academic work
- Discipline: sociolinguistics
- Institutions: University of Essex; University of Reading; University of Lausanne; University of Fribourg

Peter Trudgill FBA (/ˈtrʌdɡɪl/ TRUD-gil; born 7 November 1943) is an English sociolinguist, academic and author.

== Biography ==
Trudgill was born in Norwich, England, and grew up in the area of Thorpe St Andrew. He attended the City of Norwich School from 1955. Trudgill studied modern languages at King's College, Cambridge and obtained a PhD from the University of Edinburgh in 1971.

Before becoming professor of sociolinguistics at the University of Essex, he taught in the Department of Linguistic Science at the University of Reading from 1970 to 1986. He was professor of English language and linguistics at the University of Lausanne, Switzerland, from 1993 to 1998, and then at the University of Fribourg, also in Switzerland, from which he retired in September 2005, and where he is now professor emeritus of English Linguistics.

He is an honorary Professor of Sociolinguistics at the University of East Anglia, in Norwich, England. On 2 June 1995 he received an honorary doctorate from the Faculty of Humanities at Uppsala University, Sweden. He also has honorary doctorates from UEA; La Trobe University, Melbourne; the University of Patras, Greece; the University of Murcia, Spain; the University of Lublin, Poland; and the University of British Columbia, Vancouver, Canada.

He has carried out linguistic fieldwork in Britain, Greece and Norway and has lectured in most European countries, Canada, the United States, Colombia, Australia, New Zealand, India, Thailand, Hong Kong, Fiji, Malawi and Japan. Peter Trudgill has been the president of the Friends of Norfolk Dialect society since its inception in 1999 and contributes a regular column on language and languages in Europe to The New European newspaper.

Trudgill is one of the first to apply Labovian sociolinguistic methodology in the UK and to provide a framework for studying dialect contact phenomena.

He has carried out studies on rhoticity in English and tracked trends in British rock music for decades, including the Beatles' decreased pronunciation of /r/s over the course of the 1960s. He was a member of the committee for England and Wales for the Atlas Linguarum Europae in the 1970s, doing some research on the East Anglian sites.

He is a member of the Norwegian Academy of Science and Letters and a Fellow of the British Academy.

Since February 2017, Trudgill has written weekly columns relating to European languages in the weekly newspaper The New European. At the end of 2017, he signed the Declaration on the Common Language of the Croats, Serbs, Bosniaks and Montenegrins.

In October 2026, Trudgill received The Neil and Saras Smith Medal, which is awarded annually by the British Academy for lifetime achievement in the scholarly study of linguistics https://www.thebritishacademy.ac.uk/prizes-medals/neil-saras-smith-medal-linguistics/

== Bibliography ==
His works include:

- 1974 The Social Differentiation of English in Norwich (based on his PhD thesis)
- 1974 Sociolinguistics: An Introduction to Language and Society
- 1976 Introduction to Sociolinguistics
- 1975 Accent, Dialect and the School
- 1979 English Accents and Dialects (with Arthur Hughes)
- 1980 Dialectology (with J. K. Chambers)
- 1982 International English (with Jean Hannah)
- 1982 Coping With America (Blackwell, 2nd edition, 1986)
- 1983 On Dialect: Social and Geographical Perspectives
- 1984 Language in the British Isles
- 1984 Applied Sociolinguistics
- 1986 Dialects in Contact
- 1990 The Dialects of England
- 1990 Bad Language (with Lars Andersson)
- 1992 Introducing Language and Society
- 1998 Language Myths (with Laurie Bauer)
- 2001 Alternative Histories of English (with Richard J. Watts)
- 2002 Sociolinguistic Variation and Change
- 2003 A Glossary of Sociolinguistics
- 2003 Norfolk Origins 7: The Norfolk Dialect
- 2004 New-Dialect Formation: The Inevitability of Colonial Englishes
- 2004 New Zealand English: Its Origins and Evolution (with et al. Elizabeth Gordon, Lyle Campbell, Margaret Maclagan, Andrea Sudbury, Jennifer Hay)
- 2008 In Sfakia: passing time in the wilds of Crete
- 2010 The Lesser-Known Varieties of English: An Introduction (with Daniel Schreier, Edgar W. Schneider)
- 2011 Sociolinguistic Typology: Social Determinants of Linguistic Complexity Oxford University Press
- 2016 Dialect matters: respecting vernacular language. Cambridge University Press
- 2018 Norwegian as a normal language and other studies in Scandinavian linguistics. Novus: Oslo
- 2023 The Long Journey of English: A Geographical History of the Language. Cambridge University Press
