= The Kipper Family =

The Kipper Family was a two-man novelty English folk group, performed as Sid Kipper and his father Henry, supposedly recently discovered traditional folk singers from Norfolk, in reality played by Chris Sugden (as Sid Kipper) and Dick Nudds (as Henry Kipper). In their backstory, they had inherited a family tradition of novel folk songs, all careful parodies of well known English traditional songs, in reality penned by Nudds and Sugden. The existence of the supposed family tradition (accompanied by a well thumbed "family song book"), and even the stage name of the duo, evoked parallels with the real world (and still active) Copper Family, a family of traditional singers from Sussex. When "Henry Kipper" supposedly retired from live performance on account of age, the son Sid was continued in character by Sugden for a number of years afterwards. The pair were a popular act on the UK folk club and festival scene from the early 1980s to the end of 1991.

== History ==
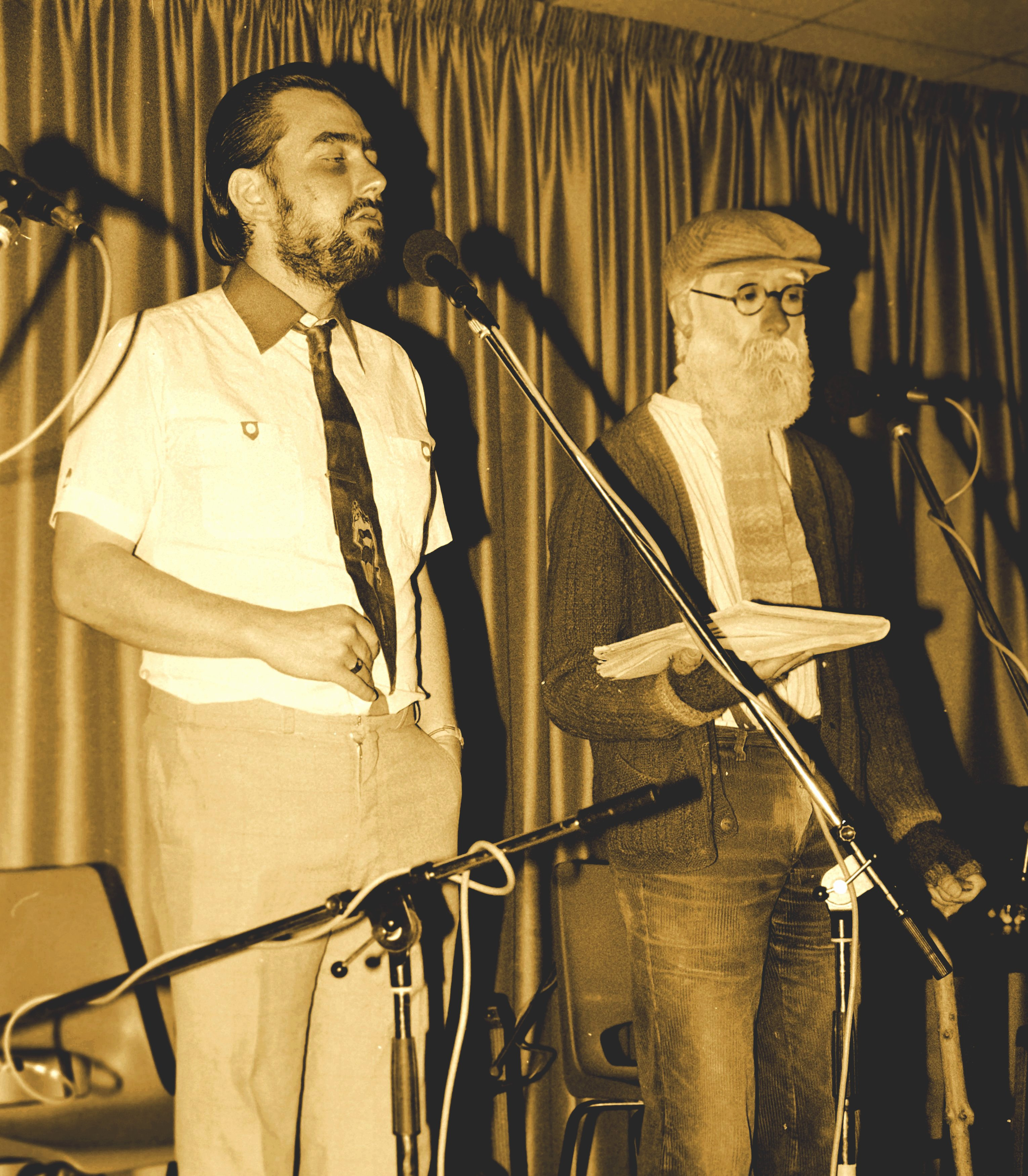
The Kipper Family, a rare archive photograph from 1985. Left: "Sid Kipper" (Sugden), right: "Henry Kipper" (Nudds).

According to their backstory, Henry Kipper was born on 4 August 1914 (the opening day of World War I and Sid on 3 September 1939 (the equivalent day for World War II), both in the fictional village of St. Just-near-Trunch in Norfolk (Trunch is a real place, but its cited near neighbour is not). Their supposed ancestor was one "Ephraim Kipper" who founded the dynasty in 1837. In a later interview, "Sid" clarified that "Henry" was not in fact his biological father, but that only his mother knew the real story, and she was not saying.

Sugden and Nudds performed as the Kipper Family throughout the 1980s and released several cult albums. With a good deal of skill and affection for their parodied originals, they performed their humorous variations of traditional folk songs, with lyrics sometimes twisted to take in themes including cross-dressing, under-age sex, homosexuality at sea and the dissection of human cadavers. In 1986 they published a song book based on their three albums released to that date, entitled "Since Time Immoral: The Kipper Family Song Book", under the auspices of the English Folk Dance and Song Society (to continue the fiction that the characters were real), under the "editorship" of Nudds and Sugden but noting on the internal copyright page "all songs and music copyright R. Nudds and C. Sugden". With illustrations by Molly Nudds, the song transcriptions were arranged in 3 sections: "The Ever Decreasing Circle: Ritual and seasonal songs" ("The Rusty Cold Farmer" to "The Lightweight Dirge"), "Love, Lust and Lamentation: Songs of courtship and marriage" ("Not Sixteen 'Til Sunday" to "The Seven Deadly Sins") and "Drowning Sorrows and Sinking Sailors: Naval, drinking and other songs" ("The Village P.I.M.P." to "The Losing of the Whale").

In the early days, the Kipper Family would perform to crowds expecting an ordinary folk act, firmly staying in character during the whole period in the public eye, and it would be several songs into the set before the penny dropped. Later recordings include "We're Norfolk and Good", "Arrest These Merry Gentlemen" and "Bored of the Dance" and also a folk opera, The Crab Wars. In addition to the released LPs, Christmas with the Kippers, a Christmas special, was recorded for BBC Radio 2. The Crab Wars, an elaborate 2xLP production, was a loose parody of Peter Bellamy's 1977 ballad opera The Transports, and (like its inspiration) featured many other "folk luminaries" of the day including Ashley Hutchings, John Kirkpatrick, Shep Woolley, Cathy Lesurf, Martin Carthy, Mick Graves, Sarah Graves, Tim Laycock, Phil Beer, Peter Bellamy, John Smith, Richard Digance, Gary Carpenter, and Fairport Convention.

They were seen once on British television. The children's programme, Get Fresh, featured a spaceship that would arrive in a different location each Saturday morning. One Saturday the destination was Trunch, and who should be there but Sid and Henry. The duo split at the end of 1991.

In 2006, Sugden presented a series of podcasts for Channel 4 radio called The Kipper Country Code, as Sid Kipper.

Chris Sugden later retired the character of Sid Kipper. Sugden died on 3 April 2024.

== Characters ==
The duo spoke in their own Norfolk accents and delivered Norfolk inspired humour. Their appearance was intended to resemble other rural folk singers, perhaps from a land forgotten by time: Sid with slicked back hair, a smart suit and a kipper tie, the look of a spiv, and Henry (Nudds made to look like an old man) with a threadbare cardigan and string to hold up his trousers in place of a belt. A contemporary poster/advertisement for bookings, including a hand drawn picture of the pair in character, and giving both Sugden's and Nudds' addresses for contacts as their "agents", read: "The Kipper Family (From Somewhere near Trunch). "The Red Herrings of Folk Song". Hitherto undiscovered traditional gems, including: "The Male Female Highwayman" - "The Village Pimp" - "A Lightweight Dirge"."

Often, as with all comedy doubles, they would swap being one down or one up with their replies:

Henry: "If you are trying to be clever with me, you're wastin' your time".
Sid: "That's true yes".

When the duo split in 1991, Henry Kipper was said to have retired to an 'Old Folkies' Home'. Some years later, Nudds decided for personal reasons that it was time Henry died and Sid announced the news; in the Trunch Trumpet (a newsletter mailed out to Kipper Family fans) for 31 July 2000 he wrote: "Henry, alleged father of folk mego-star Sid Kipper and erstwhile member of the Kipper Family, departed this earth on July 29th. After a long and painful existence, not least for his family, he passed away peacefully in mid anecdote. So in a very real sense he went quietly in everyone else's sleep. Now we shall never know just what it was he said to Cedric Cockle about his artichokes at the Trunch Pig and Produce Show in 1947."

The supposed history (and pre-history) of the Kipper Family and their antecedents was related by "Sid" and relayed by his alter ego Sugden as "The Ballad of Sid Kipper", composed in 1996 for one of the duo's books. From this we learn, among other interesting facts, that Sid's supposed birth in 1939 was in fact a fiction (a fiction within a fiction in actuality), registered in order to claim extra rations on the outbreak of war, and that "Sid"'s actual birth did not occur until September 1946.

The noted, genuine traditional singer Walter Pardon was born, and lived virtually his whole life, in Knapton, the next village to Trunch (less than 2 miles away in fact); he was discovered, and brought to the attention of the British Folk establishment to some degree of acclaim, as recently as the 1970s. Speculation as to whether his singing style, or any other related issues had any bearing on that of the Kipper Family (as "discovered" by Sugden and Nudds early in the following decade) remains studiously unanswered.

== Albums ==
=== The Kipper Family ===
- Since Time Immoral (1984)
- The Ever Decreasing Circle (1985)
- The Crab Wars (1986)
- Fresh Yesterday (1988)
- Arrest These Merry Gentlemen (1989)
- In the Family Way (1991)
- Two-Faced (2011)

For solo albums as Sid Kipper, refer the "albums" section for the Wikipedia article Chris Sugden.
