= Sidney Grapes =

British comedian

- Born: 6 June 1887
- Died: 28 April 1958 (aged 70)
- Occupation: Norfolk writer
- Writing career
- Period: 1946–1958
- Notable works: The Boy John Letters and the Boy John Again

Sidney Samuel Grapes (6 June 1887 – 28 April 1958) was a dialectic comedian from Norfolk, England, famous for his "Boy John" letters written between 1946 and 1958.

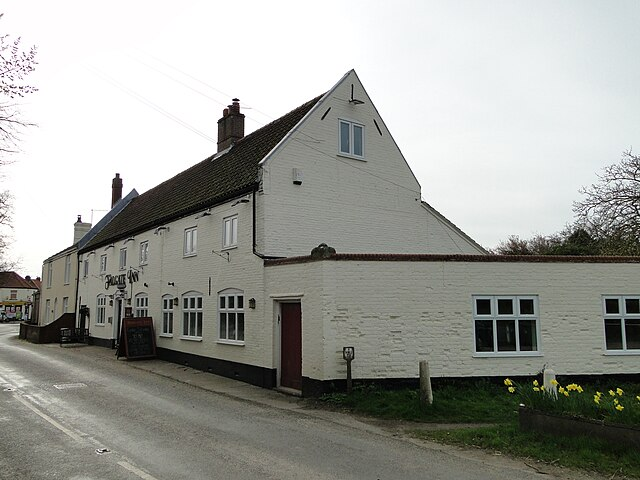
Falgate Inn at Potter Heigham (Adrian S Pye)

== Early life ==
Sidney Grapes was born at Potter Heigham in Norfolk on 6, June 1887. His parents, Solomon Samuel and Sarah Elizabeth, were second cousins who had married only four and a half months before he was born. When they married, Samuel was 38, and Sarah was ten years younger.

His parents' social status was that of rural traders and artisans. His father (who liked to be known as "Samuel") was a carpenter, wheelwright, and farmer. His mother was the daughter of George Grapes, a licensed hawker who lived in the nearby village of Ludham. As a young woman, she had been a domestic servant at Witton Hall, near Norwich.

Grapes' family lived next to the Falgate Inn until 1903, when Samuel bought a villa called "The Limes" for £380.

Grapes attended the village school and then set up his own business. By the age of 20, he was an agent for Raleigh Cycles, and he went on to expand this business, becoming a motorcycle agent, motor engineer, and garage owner.

Grapes' forebears had lived in Potter Heigham since at least the sixteenth century, and he was to live in the village his whole life.

In January 1915, Grapes sang two songs at a concert in aid of the Belgium Relief Fund. Performing sketches in the same show was Ella Ostler, a schoolteacher from Lincolnshire who probably worked locally. In late 1916, Grapes and Ella were married, probably at Weston, Lincolnshire, where Ella’s father was the stationmaster.

The 1921 census shows Grapes as a motor engineer and employer living with his wife, his wife's mother, and his wife's six-year-old niece. His mother-in-law was part of his household for many years (even though her husband was alive) and died in 1930.

== Career as an entertainer ==
In August 1907, Grapes played the role of Alick in a historical pageant about the last days of St Benet's Abbey written by Louis N. Parker. He and other rustic characters spoke dialogue in "the Broad Norfolk of pre-School Board days," added by the Rev. Maurice Bird, the Norfolk Field Naturalist. Bird's use of dialect may have influenced Sidney's later writings.

In his early twenties, he began making a reputation for himself as a comedian. His earliest comic performance may have been at a Church concert in the nearby village of Ludham in April 1909. By February 1910, his act at the Potter Heigham Social Club included "clever impersonations."

His early performances were limited to places within a five-mile radius of his home. His first performance further afield was a Conservative and Unionist dinner held at Great Yarmouth in February 1925. This engagement came after a hiatus in his career of several years, during which time he may have concentrated on his garage business.

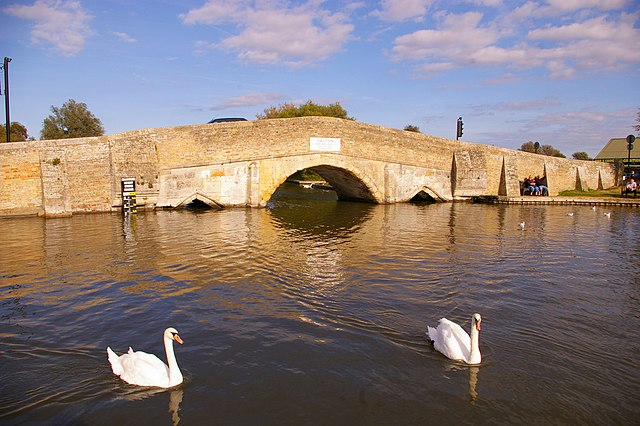
The Old Bridge, Potter Heigham (Christine Matthews)

From the early 1930s, his engagements became more frequent, and he travelled further afield, going all over Norfolk and into parts of Suffolk. He typically performed at dinners and small gatherings, where his comic stories evoked nostalgia for a lost world. He did not often perform in theatres, and when he entered a variety talent show at the Regal Theatre, Yarmouth, in 1935, he won joint third prize with a speciality dancer.

In the 1940's and 1950's, radio broadcasts boosted Grapes' reputation. A newspaper report of December 1949 noted that he had broadcast on the radio several times, and in 1956, he was a guest on Woman's Hour, aired from the Assembly House, Norwich.

From 1946, Grapes began writing letters to the Eastern Daily Press using the persona of "Boy John," a farm labourer who told stories about himself and his eccentric relatives and neighbours. These comic tales display a masterful use of dialect and were enormously popular. In about 1959, a selection of the letters was printed as a book.

== Death ==
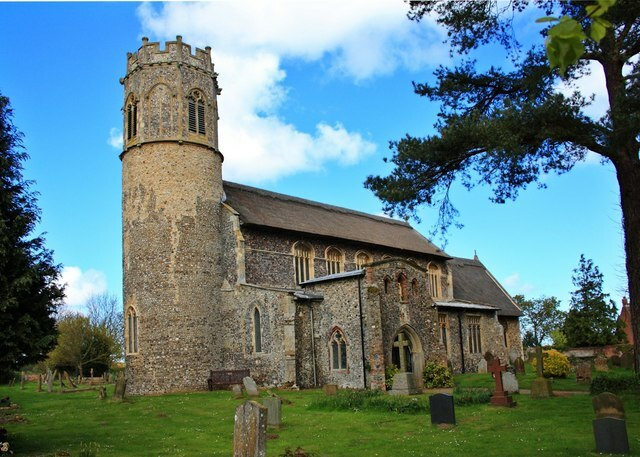
St Nicholas Church, Potter Heigham (Paul Buckingham)

Grapes died on 28 April 1958, aged 70. A Funeral service was held on 1 May 1950 at Potter Heigham Church where he was church warden. The service was followed by cremation St Faith's. After his death, funds were donated for a memorial, and a Vestry was erected in the church and dedicated to his memory. Ella remained at the same address, Uptop, Station Road, Potter Heigham, until shortly before her death on 1 August 1983, aged 98. She died at the Fairhaven nursing home in Peterborough. Her funeral service was held at Potter Heigham Church on 4 August, followed by cremation at Earlham Crematorium.

By her will, she left the copyright and future royalties of all the "Boy John" books and articles to the Vicar and Churchwardens of Potter Heigham Church. Her name was added to the vestry in the church after her death.
