= Chris Sugden =

English humorist

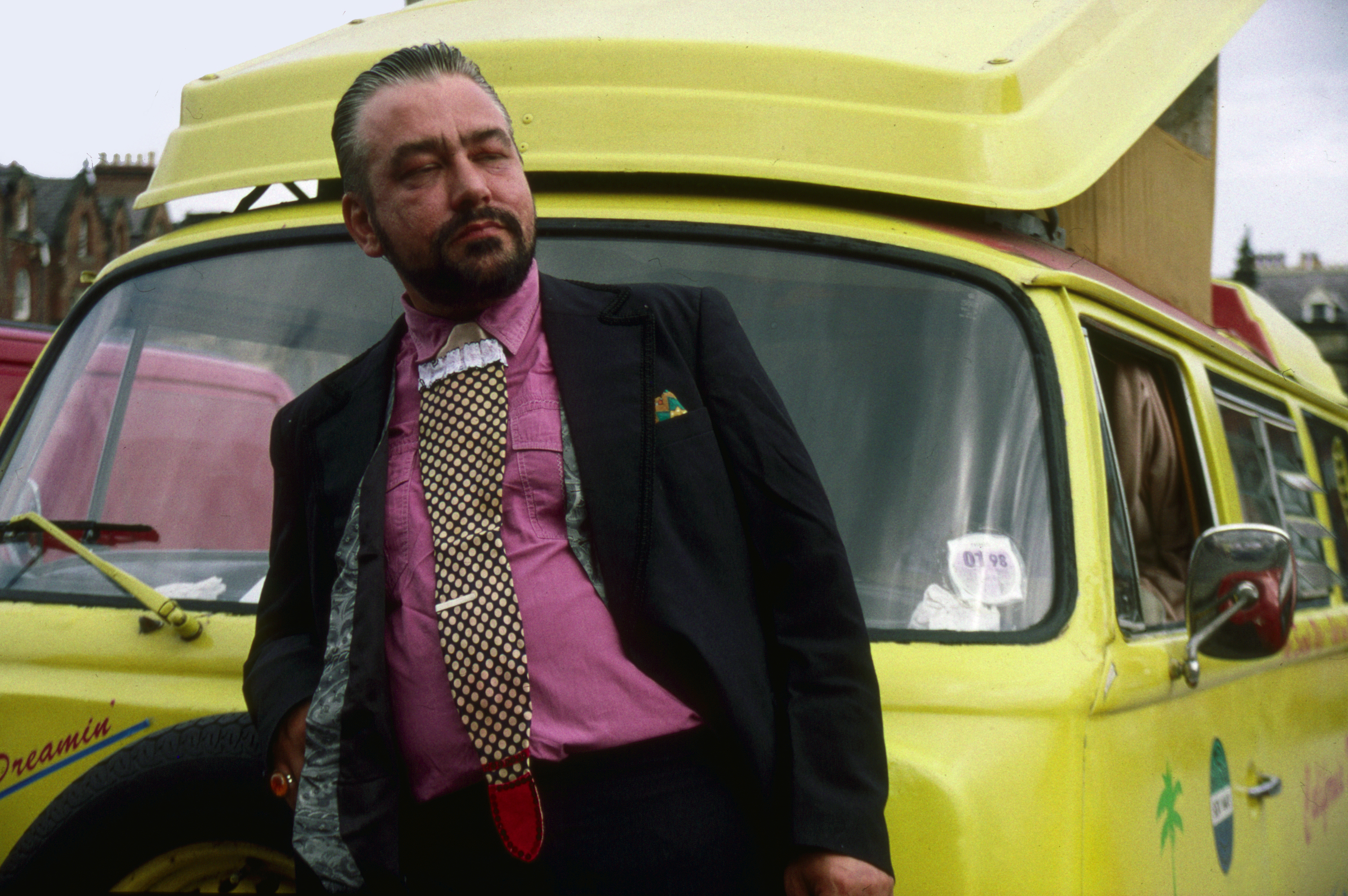

Chris Sugden (1952 – 2024) was an English humorist from Norfolk, best known for his portrayal of fictional folk singer Sid Kipper, the younger half of the Kipper Family. He authored books including Prewd and Prejudice: A Norfolk Exile, a satire of The Country Diary of an Edwardian Lady.

== Early life ==
He was born in West Runton in 1952. Sugden initially studied pharmacy at Leicester Polytechnic before starting a PhD at the University of East Anglia.

== Career ==
He wrote Prewd and Prejudice (1994). Written a dead-pan style, Prewd and Prejudice concerns itself with the Norfolk countryside, misconceptions about Norfolk and its self-deprecating folk. Sugden wrote that "the national papers seemed to think that it took the mickey out of country people, while the Norfolk people thought it ridiculed Londoners".

Sugden authored The Cromer-Sheringham Crab Wars and the song "Like a Rhinestone Ploughboy". He is the compiler of an (as yet) unpublished rhyming dictionary of Norfolk place-names for song-writing purposes. In 1996 he published The Ballad of Sid Kipper.

In 2006, Sugden presented a series of podcasts for Channel 4 radio called "The Kipper Country Code", as Sid Kipper.

He died on April 3, 2024.

== Acceptance ==
Eastern Daily Press columnist Keith Skipper claimed that Sugden is "probably the county’s finest ambassador who captures the true spirit of Norfolk, teaches it tricks, then sends it to run riot across the land".

== Albums ==
The Kipper Family (with Dick Nudds aka Henry Kipper)

- Since Time Immoral (1984)
- The Ever Decreasing Circle (1985)
- The Crab Wars (1986)
- Fresh Yesterday (1988)
- Arrest These Merry Gentlemen (1989)
- In the Family Way (1991)
- Two-Faced (2011)

Sid Kipper

- Like A Rhinestone Ploughboy (1994)
- Spineless (1997)
- Boiled in the Bag (1997)
- East Side Story (2000)
- Cod Pieces (2002)
- Chained Melody (2003)
- In Season (2007)
- Gutless (2011)

== Books ==
- Prewd and Prejudice (1994)
- Crab Wars (1999)
- Cod Pieces (2001)
- Man of Convictions (2003)
- The Ballad of Sid Kipper (1996) (out of print)
