= List of English homographs =

Homographs are words with the same spelling but having more than one meaning. Homographs may be pronounced the same (homophones), or they may be pronounced differently (heteronyms, also known as heterophones).

Some homographs are nouns or adjectives when the accent is on the first syllable, and verbs when it is on the second. When the prefix "re-" is added to a monosyllabic word, the word gains currency both as a noun and as a verb.

Most of the pairs listed below are closely related: for example, "absent" as a noun meaning "missing", and as a verb meaning "to make oneself missing". There are also many cases in which homographs are of an entirely separate origin, or whose meanings have diverged to the point that present-day speakers have little historical understanding: for example, "bat". Many, though not all of these, have first syllables that evolved from Latin. Also, some words only exhibit stress alternation in certain dialects of English. For a list of homographs with different pronunciations (heteronyms) see Heteronym (linguistics).

== A ==
- absent
- accent
- action
- adder
- address
- advocate
- affect
- agape
- Albanian
- alternate
- an
- analyses
- anon
- appropriate
- arm
- as
- ash
- attribute
- axes

== B ==
- back
- balance
- ball
- balls
- bank
- bar
- barb
- bark
- barrow
- bass
- bat
- battery
- bay
- bear
- been
- billet
- bimonthly
- biomed
- biot
- bleach
- bone
- boring
- bot
- bougie
- bound
- bow
- brace
- brilliant
- broke
- buck
- buffalo
- buffet
- building
- bunny

== C ==
- cab
- calculus
- can
- canon
- capital
- carp
- celibate
- certain
- chad
- chap
- character
- change
- chest
- chile
- china
- chuck
- cleave
- clerical
- clip
- close
- clove
- club
- colon
- coma
- combat
- combine
- commune
- con
- console
- contact
- content
- contest
- contract
- converse
- convert
- cool
- cot
- cow
- crane
- cuff
- cup

== D ==
- dab
- danish
- damper
- date
- dear
- decrease
- default
- degree
- deliberate
- demean
- den
- desert
- die
- discharge
- discount
- dismiss
- dismount
- display
- dock
- does
- doing
- done
- dove
- down
- drain
- drawer
- dub
- duck
- dummy
- duplicate

== E ==
- effect
- egg
- eh
- elaborate
- emit
- engage
- entrance
- es
- even
- evening
- excuse
- exploit
- extract

== F ==
- fabric
- fall
- fan
- fairly
- file
- finance
- fine
- firm
- fish
- fit
- flatter
- flip
- float
- fluid
- flush
- fly
- float
- foo
- foot
- football field
- for
- found
- frail
- funny

== G ==
- gain
- gas
- gay
- Georgia
- girt
- glower
- go
- gomer
- gorge
- grail
- grate
- grave
- guilt
- gyp
- gyro

== H ==
- hallow
- handy
- harbor
- hard
- het
- hew
- hex
- hive
- hoard
- hoe
- hone

== I ==
- impact
- implant
- import
- impound
- inch
- incline
- inclined
- increase
- insert
- insult
- integral
- intercept
- interchange
- intestine
- intimate
- into
- intrigue
- invalid
- invite
- iris

== J ==
- jam
- jerry
- jersey
- just

== K ==
- kind
- knot

== L ==
- la
- lair
- lake
- land
- landed
- lap
- last
- lay
- layer
- le
- lead
- learned
- leave
- leaves
- Lebanon
- leer
- left
- letter
- lie
- light
- lighter
- limp
- lit
- lithe
- live
- lo
- log
- lose
- lumber

== M ==
- mali
- manga
- manifest
- mark
- mash
- mass
- mat
- match
- mate
- may
- mean
- median
- mind
- mint
- minute
- misled
- mister
- modal
- mode
- model
- mold
- mole
- moped
- mora
- mortar
- mot
- mother
- mould
- mouse
- mow
- murder
- murk

== N ==
- nail
- nait
- nappy
- natural
- note
- notice
- novel
- number
- nut

== O ==
- obituary
- object
- objective
- obtuse
- odd
- offense
- oke
- ole
- one
- ought
- overcount
- overlay
- overlook

== P ==
- palm
- park
- patient
- pawn
- peak
- pen
- pencil
- perfect
- perfume
- periodic
- permit
- pervert
- pitch
- pin
- plain
- plane
- plaster
- play
- plight
- polish
- polo
- pop
- portmanteau
- possess
- pound
- predate
- present
- pretty
- prize
- proceeds
- progress
- project
- prop
- protest
- puck
- pupil
- purpose
- pussy
- putting

== Q ==
- quail
- quarry
- quarter

== R ==
- racket
- rail
- rank
- read
- reading
- rear
- rebel
- recall
- recap
- recess
- record
- redress
- reed
- refund
- refuse
- regress
- reject
- relapse
- remake
- research
- resent
- reservation
- resume
- retake
- retard
- retract
- revolt
- rick
- riddle
- right
- ring
- rip
- rock
- rode
- roll
- rose
- round
- rout
- row
- ruler

== S ==
- sally
- saw
- scale
- scared
- school
- seal
- seam
- second
- seer
- separate
- sewer
- sheer
- short
- shorts
- show
- shower
- sign
- sink
- skied
- sky
- slack
- slash
- slip
- smelt
- solar
- SOS
- sow
- spanging
- spelt
- spirit
- spoke
- spring
- stand
- staunch
- stone
- stoop
- story
- straight
- subject
- sum
- survey
- suspect
- swede

== T ==
- taint
- tally
- tang
- tatty
- tear
- the
- theory
- they
- tie
- tiff
- tire
- toll
- tongs
- too
- top
- train
- transfer
- transform
- transplant
- transport
- transpose
- tray
- type

== U ==
- undercount
- unionized
- update
- uplift
- upset

== V ==
- venery
- virus

== W ==
- wane
- Washington
- waste
- watch
- wave
- wax
- weed
- were
- wicked
- widget
- wild
- wilt
- win
- wind
- window
- wither
- wound

== Y ==
- yard
- ye
- yeller
- you

== See also ==
- Initial-stress-derived noun
- List of English words with disputed usage
