= English phonology =

Phonology of the English language

English phonology is the system of sounds used in spoken English. Like many languages, English has wide variation in pronunciation, both historically and from dialect to dialect. In general, however, the dialects of English around the world have largely similar (but not identical) phonological systems. Among other things, most dialects have vowel reduction in unstressed syllables and a complex set of phonological features that distinguish fortis and lenis consonants (stops, affricates, and fricatives).

Phonological analysis of English often concentrates on prestige or standard accents, such as Received Pronunciation for England, General American for the United States, and General Australian for Australia. Nevertheless, many other dialects of spoken English have developed, different from these standard accents, particularly regional dialects. Descriptions of standard reference accents provide only a limited guide to the phonology of other dialects of English.

== Phonemes ==
A phoneme of a language or dialect is an abstraction of a speech sound or of a group of different sounds that are all perceived to have the same function by speakers of that particular language or dialect. For example, the English word three consists of three phonemes: the initial ⟨th⟩ sound, the ⟨r⟩ sound, and a vowel sound. The phonemes in that and many other English words do not always correspond directly to the letters used to spell them (English orthography is not as strongly phonemic as that of many other languages).

The number and distribution of phonemes in English vary from dialect to dialect, and also depend on the interpretation of the individual researcher. The number of consonant phonemes is generally put at 24 (or slightly more depending on the dialect). The number of vowels is subject to greater variation; in the system presented on this page there are 20–25 vowel phonemes in Received Pronunciation, 14–16 in General American and 19–21 in Australian English. The pronunciation keys used in dictionaries generally contain a slightly greater number of symbols than this, to take account of certain sounds used in foreign words and certain noticeable distinctions that may not be – strictly speaking – phonemic.

=== Consonants ===
The following table shows the 24 consonant phonemes found in most dialects of English, plus /x/, whose distribution is more limited. Fortis consonants are always voiceless, aspirated in syllable onset (except in clusters beginning with /s/ or /ʃ/), and sometimes also glottalized to an extent in syllable coda (most likely to occur with /t/, see T-glottalization), while lenis consonants are always unaspirated and un-glottalized, and generally partially or fully voiced. The alveolars are usually apical, i.e. pronounced with the tip of the tongue touching or approaching the roof of the mouth, though some speakers produce them laminally, i.e. with the blade of the tongue.

		Labial	Dental	Alveolar	Post- alveolar	Dorsal	Glottal
Nasal		m (Note: Some varieties of English have syllabic consonants in some words, principally [l̩, m̩, n̩], for example at the end of bottle, rhythm and button. In such cases, no phonetic vowel is pronounced between the last two consonants, and the last consonant forms a syllable on its own. Syllabic consonants can be transcribed with a vertical line under the consonant letter, so the phonetic transcription of bottle and button in GA would be [ˈbɑɾl̩] and [ˈbʌʔn̩]. In theory, such consonants could be analyzed as individual phonemes. However, this would add several extra consonant phonemes to the inventory for English, and phonologists prefer to identify syllabic nasals and liquids phonemically as /əC/. Thus button phonemically ends in /ən/ and bottle phonemically ends in /əl/.)		n		ŋ	
Plosive/ Affricate	fortis	p		t	tʃ	k	
Plosive/ Affricate	lenis	b		d	dʒ	ɡ	
Fricative	fortis	f	θ (Note: /θ, ð/ are realized as stops in accents affected by th-stopping, such as Hiberno-English, the New York accent, and South Asian English. They are merged with /f, v/ in accents affected by th-fronting, such as some varieties of Cockney and African American Vernacular English. See Pronunciation of English ⟨th⟩.)	s	ʃ	(x) (Note: The voiceless velar fricative /x/ is mainly used in Hiberno-English, Scottish, South African and Welsh English; words with /x/ in Scottish accents tend to be pronounced with /k/ in other dialects. The velar fricative sometimes appears in recent loanwords such as chutzpah. Under the influence of Welsh and Afrikaans, the actual phonetic realization of /x/ in Welsh English and White South African English is uvular [χ], rather than velar [x]. Dialects do not necessarily agree on the exact words in which /x/ appears; for instance, in Welsh English it appears in loanwords from Welsh (such as Amlwch /ˈæmlʊx/), whereas in White South African English it appears only in loanwords from Afrikaans or Xhosa (such as gogga /ˈxɒxə/ 'insect'). It may also occur in some English speech for loan words, such as "loch" or "Bach".)	h (Note: This sound may not be a phoneme in H-dropping dialects.)
Fricative	lenis	v	ð	z	ʒ		h
Approximant		w (Note: In some conservative accents in Scotland, Ireland, the southern United States, and New England, the digraph ⟨wh⟩ in words like which and whine represents a voiceless w sound [ʍ], a voiceless labiovelar fricative or approximant, which contrasts with the voiced w of witch and wine. In most dialects, this sound is lost, and is pronounced as a voiced w (the wine–whine merger). Phonemically this sound may be analysed as a consonant cluster /hw/, rather than as a separate phoneme */ʍ/, so which and whine are transcribed phonemically as /hwɪtʃ/ and /hwaɪn/. This does not mean that such speakers actually pronounce [h] followed by [w]: this phonemic transcription /hw/ is simply a convenient way of representing a single sound [ʍ] when such dialects are not analysed as having an extra phoneme.)		l	r (Note: This phoneme is conventionally transcribed with the basic Latin letter ⟨r⟩ (the IPA symbol for the alveolar trill), even though its pronunciation is usually a postalveolar approximant [ɹ̠]. The trill exists but is rare, found only in some Scottish, Welsh, South African and Indian dialects. See Pronunciation of English /r/.)	j (Note: The sound at the beginning of huge in most British accents is a voiceless palatal fricative [ç], but this is analysed phonemically as the consonant cluster /hj/ so that huge is transcribed /hjuːdʒ/. As with /hw/, this does not mean that speakers pronounce [h] followed by [j]; the phonemic transcription /hj/ is simply a convenient way of representing the single sound [ç]. The yod-dropping found in the Norfolk dialect means that the traditional Norfolk pronunciation of huge is [hʊudʒ] and not [çuːdʒ].)	

==== Consonant examples ====
The following table shows typical examples of the occurrence of the above consonant phonemes in words, using minimal pairs where possible.

Fortis		Lenis	
/p/	pit	/b/	bit
/t/	tin	/d/	din
/k/	cut	/ɡ/	gut
/tʃ/	cheap	/dʒ/	jeep
/f/	fat	/v/	vat
/θ/	thigh	/ð/	thy
/s/	sap	/z/	zap
/ʃ/	dilution	/ʒ/	delusion
/x/	loch		
/h/	ham		
		/m/	hum
		/n/	Hun
		/ŋ/	hung
		/j/	your
		/w/	wore
		/r/	roar
		/l/	lore

==== Sonorants ====
- The pronunciation of /l/ varies by dialect:
  - Received Pronunciation has two main allophones of /l/: the clear, or plain, [l] (the "light L"), and the dark, or velarized, [ɫ] (the "dark L"). The clear variant is used before vowels when they are in the same syllable, and the dark variant when the /l/ precedes a consonant or is in syllable-final position before silence.
  - In South Wales, Ireland, and the Caribbean, /l/ is usually clear, and in North Wales, Scotland, Australia, and New Zealand it is usually dark.
  - In General American and Canada, /l/ is generally dark, but to varying degrees: before stressed vowels it is neutral or only slightly velarized. In southern U.S. accents it is noticeably clear between vowels, and in some other positions.
  - In urban accents of Southern England, as well as New Zealand and some parts of the United States, /l/ can be pronounced as an approximant or semivowel ([w], [o], [ʊ]) at the end of a syllable (l-vocalization).
- Depending on dialect, /r/ has at least the following allophones in varieties of English around the world (see Pronunciation of English /r/):
  - postalveolar approximant [ɹ̠] (the most common realization of the /r/ phoneme, occurring in most dialects, RP and General American included)
  - retroflex approximant [ɻ] (occurs in most Irish dialects and some American dialects)
  - labiodental approximant [ʋ] (occurs in south-east England and some London accents; also in Singapore English among younger speakers. See r-labialization)
  - alveolar flap [ɾ] (occurs in most Scottish, Welsh, Indian and some South African dialects, some conservative dialects in England and Ireland; not to be confused with flapping of /t/ and /d/)
  - alveolar trill [r] (occurs in some very conservative Scottish dialects and some Indian, South African and Welsh accents)
  - voiced uvular fricative [ʁ] (occurs in northern Northumbria, largely disappeared; known as the Northumbrian burr)
- In most dialects /r/ is labialized [ɹ̠ʷ] in many positions, as in reed [ɹ̠ʷiːd] and tree [t̠ɹ̠̊ʷiː]; in the latter case, the /t/ may be slightly labialized as well.
- In some rhotic accents, such as General American, /r/ when not followed by a vowel is realized as an r-coloring of the preceding vowel or its coda: nurse [ˈnɚs], butter [ˈbʌɾɚ].
- The distinctions between the nasals are neutralized in some environments. For example, before a final /p/, /t/ or /k/ there is nearly always only one nasal sound that can appear in each case: [m], [n] or [ŋ] respectively (as in the words limp, lint, link – note that the n of link is pronounced [ŋ]). This effect can even occur across syllable or word boundaries, particularly in stressed syllables: synchrony is pronounced [ˈsɪŋkɹəni] whereas synchronic may be pronounced with either [sɪŋ-] or [sɪn-]. For other possible syllable-final combinations, see § Coda in the Phonotactics section below.

==== Obstruents ====
In most dialects, the fortis stops and affricate /p, t, tʃ, k/ have various different allophones, and are distinguished from the lenis stops and affricate /b, d, dʒ, ɡ/ by several phonetic features.

- The allophones of the fortes /p, t, tʃ, k/ include:
  - aspirated [pʰ, tʰ, kʰ] when they occur in the onset of a stressed syllable, as in potato. In clusters involving a following liquid, the aspiration typically manifests as the devoicing of this liquid. These sounds are unaspirated [p, t, k] after /s/ within the same syllable, as in stan, span, scan, and at the ends of syllables, as in mat, map, mac. The voiceless fricatives are nearly always unaspirated, but a notable exception is English-speaking areas of Wales, where they are often aspirated. An alternative interpretation of the /s/–stop clusters is that all stops following /s/ are in fact lenis: this is the interpretation favoured by Dr Geoff Lindsey. Taking this analysis as axiomatic, stan [stan], span [span], and scan [skan] would thus be notated /sdan, sban, sgan/. Moreover, English fortis stops are not only aspirated, but often somewhat affricated; in the case of mat, map, mac therefore, the contrast between lenis and fortis is preserved through the affrication, when the stops are realised ‘fully’, rather than glottalised or otherwise reduced: [matˢ, mapᶲ, makˣ].
  - In many accents of English, fortis stops /p, t, k, tʃ/ are glottalized in some positions. This may be heard either as a glottal stop preceding the oral closure ("pre-glottalization" or "glottal reinforcement") or as a substitution of the glottal stop [ʔ] for the oral stop (glottal replacement). /tʃ/ can be only pre-glottalized. Pre-glottalization normally occurs in British and American English when the fortis consonant phoneme is followed by another consonant or when the consonant is in final position. Thus football and catching are often pronounced [ˈfɵʔtboːl] and [ˈkʰaʔtʃɪŋ], respectively. Even more frequently, glottal replacement happens in such cases involving /t/, so that football is pronounced [ˈfɵʔboːl]. In addition, however, glottal replacement is increasingly common in British English when /t/ occurs between vowels if the preceding vowel is stressed; thus better is often pronounced by younger speakers as [ˈbɛʔə]. Such t-glottalization also occurs in many British regional accents, including Cockney, where it can also occur at the end of words, and where /p/ and /k/ are sometimes treated the same way.
  - For some RP-speakers, final voiceless stops, especially /k/, may become ejectives.
- Among stops, both fortes and lenes:
  - May have no audible release [p̚, b̚, t̚, d̚, k̚, ɡ̚] in the word-final position. These allophones are more common in North America than Great Britain.
  - Almost always have a masked release before another plosive or affricate (as in rubbed [ˈɹʌˑb̚d̥]), i.e. the release of the first stop is made after the closure of the second stop. This also applies when the following stop is homorganic (articulated in the same place), as in top player. A notable exception is Welsh English in which stops are usually released in that environment.
  - The affricates /tʃ, dʒ/ have a mandatory fricative release in all environments.
- Very often in the United States and Canada and less frequently in Australia and New Zealand, both /t/ and /d/ can be pronounced as a voiced flap [ɾ] in certain positions: when they come between a preceding stressed vowel (possibly with intervening /r/) and precede an unstressed vowel or syllabic /l/. Examples include water, bottle, petal, peddle (the last two words sound alike when flapped). The flap may even appear at word boundaries, as in put it on. When the combination /nt/ appears in such positions, some American speakers pronounce it as a nasalized flap that may become indistinguishable from /n/, so winter [ˈwɪɾ̃ɚ] may be pronounced similarly or identically to winner [ˈwɪnɚ].
- Yod-coalescence is a process that palatalizes the clusters /dj/, /tj/, /sj/ and /zj/ into [dʒ], [tʃ], [ʃ] and [ʒ] respectively, frequently occurring with clusters that would be considered to span a syllable boundary.
  - Yod-coalescence in stressed syllables, such as in tune and dune, occurs in Australian, Cockney, Estuary English, Hiberno-English (some speakers), Newfoundland English, South African English, and to a certain extent in New Zealand English and Scottish English (many speakers). This can lead to additional homophony; for instance, dew and due come to be pronounced the same as Jew.
  - In certain varieties such as Australian English, South African English, and New Zealand English, /sj/ and /zj/ in stressed syllables can coalesce into [ʃ] and [ʒ], respectively. In Australian English for example, assume is pronounced [əˈʃʉːm] by some speakers. Furthermore, some British, Canadian, American, New Zealand and Australian speakers may change the /s/ sound to /ʃ/ before /tr/; for example, these speakers pronounce strewn as [ʃtruːn].
- The postalveolar consonants /tʃ, dʒ, ʃ, ʒ/ are strongly labialized: [tʃʷ dʒʷ ʃʷ ʒʷ], at least in RP.
- In addition to /tʃ, dʒ/, the sequences /ts, dz, tr, dr, tθ, dð, pf, bv/ also have affricate-like realizations in certain positions (as in cats, roads, tram, dram, eighth, behind them, cupful, obvious; see also § Onset) but usually only /tʃ, dʒ/ are considered to constitute the monophonemic affricates of English because (among other reasons) only they are found in all of morpheme-initial, -‍internal, and -‍final positions, and native speakers typically perceive them as single units.

=== Vowels ===
English, much like other Germanic languages, has a particularly large number of vowel phonemes, and in addition the vowels of English differ considerably between dialects. Consequently, corresponding vowels may be transcribed with various symbols depending on the dialect under consideration. When considering English as a whole, lexical sets are often used, each named by a word containing the vowel or vowels in question. For example, the LOT set consists of words which, like lot, have /ɒ/ in British Received Pronunciation (RP) and /ɑ/ in General American (GA). The "LOT vowel" then refers to the vowel that appears in those words in whichever dialect is being considered, or (at a greater level of abstraction) to a diaphoneme, which represents this interdialectal correspondence. A commonly used system of lexical sets, devised by John C. Wells, is presented below; for each set, the corresponding phonemes are given for RP and General American, using the notation that will be used on this page.

Full monophthongs
LS	RP	GA	AuE
TRAP	æ	æ	æ
BATH	ɑː	æ	aː
PALM	ɑː	ɑ	aː
LOT	ɒ	ɑ	ɔ
CLOTH	ɒ	ɔ, ɑ	ɔ
THOUGHT	ɔː	ɔ, ɑ	oː
KIT	ɪ		
DRESS	ɛ (Note: In RP, /ɛ/ may be transcribed as /e/, which reflects a more conservative pronunciation.)		e
STRUT	ʌ		a
FOOT	ʊ		

Diphthongs in many dialects
LS	RP	GA	AuE
FACE	eɪ		æɪ
GOAT	əʊ	oʊ	əʉ
FLEECE	iː	i	iː
GOOSE	uː	u	ʉː

Full diphthongs
LS	RP	GA	AuE
PRICE	aɪ		ɑɪ
CHOICE	ɔɪ		oɪ
MOUTH	aʊ		æɔ

Vowels + historical /r/
LS	RP	GA	AuE
NURSE	ɜː	ɜr (Note: The sound that scholars traditionally transcribe /ɜr/ in GA is in fact usually merged with /ər/.)	ɜː
START	ɑː	ɑr	aː
NORTH	ɔː	ɔr	oː
FORCE	ɔː	ɔr	oː
NEAR	ɪə	ɪr	ɪə
SQUARE	ɛː	ɛr	eː
CURE	ʊə, ɔː	ʊr	oː

Reduced vowels
LS	RP	GA	AuE
COMMA	ə	ə	ə
LETTER	ə	ər	ə
HAPPY	i		

For a table that shows the pronunciations of these vowels in a wider range of English accents, see Sound correspondences between English accents.

The following tables show the vowel phonemes of three standard varieties of English. The notation system used here for Received Pronunciation (RP) is fairly standard; the others less so. The feature descriptions given here (back, open, etc.) are abstracted somewhat; the actual pronunciations of these vowels are somewhat more accurately conveyed by the IPA symbols used (see Vowel for a chart indicating the meanings of these symbols; though note also the points listed below the following tables). The symbols given in the table are traditional but redirect to their modern implementation.

Received Pronunciation
	Front		Central		Back			
	Front		Central		unrounded		rounded	
	short	long	short	long	short	long	short	long
Close	ɪ		ʊ					ɔː (Note: The Standard Southern British vowels /uː/, /ɔː/ and /ɒ/ are very similar to the corresponding Australian phonemes /ʉː/, /oː/ and /ɔ/. The difference between them lies mostly in transcription (the way they are transcribed in RP is more conservative).)
Mid	ɛ	ɛː	ə	ɜː	ʌ		ɒ	
Open	æ					ɑː		
Diphthongs	iː eɪ aɪ ɔɪ aʊ əʊ uː ɪə ʊə							
Triphthongs	(eɪə aɪə ɔɪə aʊə əʊə)							

General American
	Front		Central		Back	
	lax	tense	lax	tense	lax	tense
Close	ɪ	i			ʊ	u
Mid	ɛ	eɪ (Note: Although the notation /eɪ oʊ/ are used for the vowels of FACE and GOAT respectively in General American, they are analysed as phonemic monophthongs and frequently transcribed as /e o/ in the literature.)	ə	(ɜ) (Note: General American does not have the opposition between /ɜr/ and /ər/; therefore, the vowels in further /ˈfɜrðər/ are typically realized with the same segmental quality as [ˈfɚðɚ]. This also makes the words forward /ˈfɔrwərd/ and foreword /ˈfɔrwɜrd/ homophonous as [ˈfɔɹwɚd]. Therefore, /ɜ/ is not a true phoneme in General American but merely a different notation of /ə/ preserved for when this phoneme precedes /r/ and is stressed – a convention adopted in literature to facilitate comparisons with other accents. What is historically /ʌr/, as in hurry, is also pronounced [ɚ] (see hurry–furry merger), so /ʌ/, /ɜ/ and /ə/ are all neutralized before /r/. Furthermore, some analyze /ʌ/ as an allophone of /ə/ that surfaces when stressed, so /ʌ/, /ɜ/ and /ə/ may be considered to be in complementary distribution and thus comprising one phoneme.)	(ʌ)	oʊ
Open	æ			ɑ		(ɔ) (Note: Many North American speakers do not distinguish /ɔ/ from /ɑ/ and merge them into /ɑ/, except before /r/ (see cot–caught merger).)
Diphthongs	aɪ ɔɪ aʊ					

General Australian
	Front		Central		Back	
	short	long	short	long	short	long
Close	ɪ				ʊ	oː
Mid	e	eː	ə	ɜː	ɔ	
Open	æ	(æː) (Note: Australian has the bad–lad split, with distinctive short and long variants in various words of the TRAP set: a long phoneme /æː/ in words like bad contrasts with a short /æ/ in words like lad. (A similar split is found in the accents of some speakers in southern England.))	a	aː		
Diphthongs	iː æɪ ɑɪ oɪ æɔ əʉ ɪə ʉː (ʊə) (Note: The vowel /ʊə/ is often omitted from descriptions of Australian, as for most speakers it has split into the long monophthong /oː/ (e.g. poor, sure) or the sequence /ʉːə/ (e.g. cure, lure).)					

The differences between these tables can be explained as follows:

- RP and General American divide words among the PALM, LOT, CLOTH, and THOUGHT sets separately from one another; RP has the phonemes /ɑː/ (PALM), /ɒ/ (LOT and CLOTH), and /ɔː/ (THOUGHT); whereas General American has the phonemes /ɑ/ (LOT and PALM) and /ɔ/ (CLOTH and THOUGHT). In a few North American accents, namely in Eastern New England (Boston) LOT words do not have the vowel of PALM (the father–bother merger has not occurred) but instead merge with CLOTH/THOUGHT.
- Although the notation /ʌ/ is used for the vowel of STRUT in RP and General American, the actual pronunciation in RP may be closer to a near-open central vowel [ɐ], especially among older speakers. In Standard Southern British, this vowel is increasingly realized as [ʌ] to avoid the clash with the lowered variety of /æ/ in the [a] region (the trap–strut merger). In General American, /ʌ/ is realized as [ʌ̟].
- Some RP transcriptions use ⟨e⟩ rather than ⟨ɛ⟩ largely for convenience and historical tradition; it does not necessarily represent a different sound from the General American phoneme, as the DRESS vowel is generally realized as [ɛ] in Standard Southern British.
- The different notations used for the vowel of GOAT in RP and General American (/əʊ/ and /oʊ/) reflect a difference in the most common phonetic realizations of that vowel.
- The triphthongs given in the RP table are usually regarded as sequences of two phonemes (a diphthong plus /ə/); however, in RP, these sequences frequently undergo smoothing into single diphthongs or even monophthongs.
- The different notations used here for some of the Australian vowels reflect the phonetic realization of those vowels in Australian: a central [ʉː] rather than [uː] in GOOSE, a more closed [e] rather than [ɛ] in DRESS, a close-mid [oː] rather than traditional RP's [ɔː] in THOUGHT, an open-mid [ɔ] rather than traditional RP's [ɒ] in LOT, an opener [a] rather than somewhat closer [ʌ] in STRUT, a central [aː] rather a back [ɑː] in CALM and START, and somewhat different pronunciations of most of the diphthongs. Note that central [ʉː] in GOOSE, close-mid [oː] in THOUGHT and open-mid [ɔ] in LOT are standard realizations in Standard Southern British and the difference between Standard Southern British and Australian English in these vowels lies almost only in transcription, rather than pronunciation.
- Both Australian /eː/ and RP /ɛː/ are long monophthongs, the difference between them being in tongue height: Australian /eː/ is close-mid [eː], whereas the corresponding RP vowel is open-mid [ɛː].

Other points to be noted are these:

- The vowel /æ/ is generally pronounced more open, approaching [a], by Standard Southern British speakers. In American speech, however, there is a tendency for it to become more closed, tenser and even diphthongized (to something like [eə]), particularly in certain environments, such as before a nasal consonant, though younger speakers of some varieties are lowering /æ/ like RP speakers (see Canadian shift). Some American accents, for example those of New York City, Philadelphia and Baltimore, make a marginal phonemic distinction between /æ/ and /eə/, although the two occur largely in mutually exclusive environments. See /æ/ raising.
- A significant number of words (the BATH group) have /æ/ in General American, but /ɑː/ in RP. The pronunciation varies between /æ/ and /aː/ in Australia, with speakers from South Australia using /aː/ more extensively than speakers from other regions.
- In General American and Canadian (which are rhotic accents, where /r/ is pronounced in positions where it does not precede a vowel), many of the vowels can be r-colored by way of realization of a following /r/. This is often transcribed phonetically using a vowel symbol with an added retroflexion diacritic ⟨˞⟩; thus the symbol [ɚ] has been created for an r-colored schwa (sometimes called schwar) as in LETTER, and the vowel of START can be modified to make [ɑ˞] so that the word start may be transcribed [stɑ˞t]. Alternatively, the START sequence might be written [stɑɚt] to indicate an r-colored offglide. The vowel of NURSE is generally always r-colored in these dialects, and this can be written [ɚ] (or as a syllabic [ɹ̩]).
- In Standard Southern British and other dialects, many words from the CURE group are coming to be pronounced by an increasing number of speakers with the NORTH vowel (so sure is often pronounced like shore).
- The vowels of FLEECE and GOOSE are commonly pronounced as narrow diphthongs, approaching [ɪi] and [ʊu], in RP. Near-RP speakers may have particularly marked diphthongization of the type [əi] and [əu ~ əʉ], respectively. In General American, the pronunciation varies between a monophthong and a diphthong.

==== Allophones of vowels ====
Listed here are some of the significant cases of allophony of vowels found within standard English dialects.

- Vowels are shortened when followed in a syllable by a voiceless (fortis) consonant. This is known as pre-fortis clipping. Thus in the following word pairs the first item has a shortened vowel while the second has a normal length vowel: 'right' /raɪt/ – 'ride' /raɪd/; 'face' /feɪs/ – 'phase' /feɪz/; 'advice' /ədvaɪs/ – 'advise' /ədvaɪz/.
- In many accents of English, tense vowels undergo breaking before /l/, resulting in pronunciations like [pʰiəɫ] for peel, [pʰuəɫ] for pool, [pʰeəɫ] for pail, and [pʰoəɫ] for pole.
- In RP, the vowel /əʊ/ may be pronounced more back, as [ɒʊ~ɔʊ], before syllable-final /l/, as in goal. In standard Australian English the vowel /əʉ/ is similarly backed to [ɔʊ] before /l/. A similar phenomenon occurs in Southern American English.
- The vowel /ə/ is often pronounced [ɐ] in open syllables.
- The PRICE and MOUTH diphthongs may be pronounced with a less open starting point when followed by a voiceless consonant; this is chiefly a feature of Canadian speech (Canadian raising), but is also found in parts of the United States. Thus writer may be distinguished from rider even when flapping causes the /t/ and /d/ to be pronounced identically.

==== Unstressed syllables ====
Unstressed syllables in English may contain almost any vowel, but in practice vowels in stressed and unstressed syllables tend to use different inventories of phonemes. In particular, long vowels are used less often in unstressed syllables than stressed syllables. Additionally there are certain sounds – characterized by central position and weakness – that are particularly often found as the nuclei of unstressed syllables. These include:

- schwa, [ə], as in COMMA and (in non-rhotic dialects) LETTER (COMMA–LETTER merger); also in many other positions such as about, photograph, paddock, etc. This sound is essentially restricted to unstressed syllables exclusively. In the approach presented here it is identified as a phoneme /ə/, although other analyses do not have a separate phoneme for schwa and regard it as a reduction or neutralization of other vowels in syllables with the lowest degree of stress.
- r-colored schwa, [ɚ], as in LETTER in General American and some other rhotic dialects, which can be identified with the underlying sequence /ər/.
- syllabic consonants: [l̩] as in bottle, [n̩] as in button, [m̩] as in rhythm. These may be phonemized either as a plain consonant or as a schwa followed by a consonant; for example button may be represented as /ˈbʌtn̩/ or /ˈbʌtən/ (see above under Consonants).
- [ɨ̞], as in roses and making. This can be identified with the phoneme /ɪ/, although in unstressed syllables it may be pronounced more centrally, and for some speakers (particularly in Australian and New Zealand and some American English) it is merged with /ə/ in these syllables (weak vowel merger). Among speakers who retain the distinction there are many cases where free variation between /ɪ/ and /ə/ is found, as in the second syllable of typical. (The OED has recently adopted the symbol ⟨ᵻ⟩ to indicate such cases.)
- [ʉ̞], as in argument, today, for which similar considerations apply as in the case of [ɨ̞]. (The symbol ⟨ᵿ⟩ is sometimes used in these cases, similarly to ⟨ᵻ⟩.) Some speakers may also have a rounded schwa, [ɵ̞], used in words like omission [ɵ̞ˈmɪʃən].
- [i], as in happy, coffee, in many dialects (others have [ɪ] in this position). The phonemic status of this [i] is not easy to establish. Some authors consider it to correspond phonemically with a close front vowel that is neither the vowel of KIT nor that of FLEECE; it occurs chiefly in contexts where the contrast between these vowels is neutralized, implying that it represents an archiphoneme, which may be written /i/. Many speakers, however, do have a contrast in pairs of words like studied and studded or taxis and taxes; the contrast may be [i] vs. [ɪ], [ɪ] vs. [ə] or [i] vs. [ə], and thus some authors consider that the happY-vowel should be identified phonemically either with the vowel of KIT or that of FLEECE, depending on the speaker. See also happy-tensing.
- [u], as in influence, to each. This is the back rounded counterpart to [i] described above; its phonemic status is treated in the same works as cited there.

Vowel reduction in unstressed syllables is a significant feature of English. Syllables of the types listed above often correspond to a syllable containing a different vowel ("full vowel") used in other forms of the same morpheme where that syllable is stressed. For example, the first o in photograph, being stressed, is pronounced with the GOAT vowel, but in photography, where it is unstressed, it is reduced to schwa. Also, certain common words (a, an, of, for, etc.) are pronounced with a schwa when they are unstressed, although they have different vowels when they are in a stressed position (see Weak and strong forms in English).

Some unstressed syllables, however, retain full (unreduced) vowels, i.e. vowels other than those listed above. Examples are the /æ/ in ambition and the /aɪ/ in finite. Some phonologists regard such syllables as not being fully unstressed (they may describe them as having tertiary stress); some dictionaries have marked such syllables as having secondary stress. However linguists such as Ladefoged and Bolinger (1986) regard this as a difference purely of vowel quality and not of stress, and thus argue that vowel reduction itself is phonemic in English. Examples of words where vowel reduction seems to be distinctive for some speakers include chickaree vs. chicory (the latter has the reduced vowel of HAPPY, whereas the former has the FLEECE vowel without reduction), and Pharaoh vs. farrow (both have the GOAT vowel, but in the latter word it may reduce to [ɵ]).

== Lexical stress ==
Lexical stress is phonemic in English. For example, the noun increase and the verb increase are distinguished by the positioning of the stress on the first syllable in the former, and on the second syllable in the latter. (See initial-stress-derived noun.) Stressed syllables in English are louder than non-stressed syllables, as well as being longer and having a higher pitch.

In traditional approaches, in any English word consisting of more than one syllable, each syllable is ascribed one of three degrees of stress: primary, secondary or unstressed. Ordinarily, in each such word there will be exactly one syllable with primary stress, possibly one syllable having secondary stress, and the remainder are unstressed (unusually-long words may have multiple syllables with secondary stress). For example, the word amazing has primary stress on the second syllable, while the first and third syllables are unstressed, whereas the word organization has primary stress on the fourth syllable, secondary stress on the first, and the second, third, and fifth unstressed. This is often shown in pronunciation keys using the IPA symbols for primary and secondary stress (which are ˈ and ˌ respectively), placed before the syllables to which they apply. The two words just given may therefore be represented as /əˈmeɪzɪŋ/ and /ˌɔːrɡənaɪˈzeɪʃən/.

Some analysts identify an additional level of stress (tertiary stress). This is generally ascribed to syllables that are pronounced with less force than those with secondary stress, but nonetheless contain a "full" or "unreduced" vowel (vowels that are considered to be reduced are listed under English phonology § Unstressed syllables above). Hence the third syllable of organization, if pronounced with /aɪ/ as shown above (rather than being reduced to /ɪ/ or /ə/), might be said to have tertiary stress. (The precise identification of secondary and tertiary stress differs between analyses; dictionaries do not generally show tertiary stress, although some have taken the approach of marking all syllables with unreduced vowels as having at least secondary stress.)

In some analyses, then, the concept of lexical stress may become conflated with that of vowel reduction. An approach that attempts to separate both is provided by Peter Ladefoged, who states that it is possible to describe English with only one degree of stress, as long as unstressed syllables are phonemically distinguished for vowel reduction. In this approach, the distinction between primary and secondary stress is regarded as a phonetic or prosodic detail rather than a phonemic feature – primary stress is seen as an example of the predictable "tonic" stress that falls on the final stressed syllable of a prosodic unit. For more details of this analysis, see Stress and vowel reduction in English.

For stress as a prosodic feature (emphasis of particular words within utterances), see § Prosodic stress below.

== Phonotactics ==
Phonotactics is the study of the sequences of phonemes that occur in languages and the sound structures that they form. In this study it is usual to represent consonants in general with the letter C and vowels with the letter V, so that a syllable such as 'be' is described as having CV structure. The IPA symbol used to show a division between syllables is the full stop ⟨.⟩. Syllabification is the process of dividing continuous speech into discrete syllables, a process in which the position of a syllable division is not always easy to decide upon.

Most languages of the world syllabify CVCV and CVCCV sequences as /CV.CV/ and /CVC.CV/ or /CV.CCV/, with consonants preferentially acting as the onset of a syllable containing the following vowel. According to one view, English is unusual in this regard, in that stressed syllables attract following consonants, so that ˈCVCV and ˈCVCCV syllabify as /ˈCVC.V/ and /ˈCVCC.V/, as long as the consonant cluster CC is a possible syllable coda; in addition, /r/ preferentially syllabifies with the preceding vowel even when both syllables are unstressed, so that CVrV occurs as /CVr.V/. This is the analysis used in the Longman Pronunciation Dictionary. However, this view is not widely accepted, as explained in the following section.

=== Syllable structure ===
English allows clusters of up to three consonants in the syllable onset and up to four consonants in the syllable coda, giving a general syllable structure of (C)^{3}V(C)^{4}, a potential example being strengths /strɛŋkθs/ (although this word has variant pronunciations with only 3 coda consonants, such as /strɛŋθs/). A five-consonant coda may occur in the word angsts, but this is a highly exceptional case, as the word is both infrequent and not always pronounced with five final segments (it can be analyzed as a VC^{4} syllable /æŋsts/ rather than as VC^{5} /æŋksts/). From the phonetic point of view, the analysis of syllable structures is a complex task: because of widespread occurrences of articulatory overlap, English speakers rarely produce an audible release of individual consonants in consonant clusters. This coarticulation can lead to articulatory gestures that seem very much like deletions or complete assimilations. For example, hundred pounds may sound like [hʌndɹɪb paʊndz] and jumped back (in slow speech, [dʒʌmptbæk]) may sound like [dʒʌmpbæk], but X-ray and electropalatographic studies demonstrate that inaudible and possibly weakened contacts or lingual gestures may still be made. Thus the second /d/ in hundred pounds does not entirely assimilate to a labial place of articulation, rather the labial gesture co-occurs with the alveolar one; the "missing" [t] in jumped back may still be articulated, though not heard.

Division into syllables is a difficult area, and different theories have been proposed. A widely accepted approach is the maximal onset principle: this states that, subject to certain constraints, any consonants in between vowels should be assigned to the following syllable. Thus the word leaving should be divided /ˈliː.vɪŋ/ rather than */ˈliːv.ɪŋ/, and hasty is /ˈheɪ.sti/ rather than */ˈheɪs.ti/ or */ˈheɪst.i/. However, when such a division results in an onset cluster that is not allowed in English, the division must respect this. Thus if the word extra were divided */ˈɛ.kstrə/ the resulting onset of the second syllable would be /kstr/, a cluster that does not occur initially in English. The division /ˈɛk.strə/ is therefore preferred. If assigning a consonant or consonants to the following syllable would result in the preceding syllable ending in an unreduced short vowel, this is avoided. Thus the word lemma should be divided /ˈlɛm.ə/ and not */ˈlɛ.mə/, even though the latter division gives the maximal onset to the following syllable.

In some cases, no solution is completely satisfactory: for example, in British English (RP) the word hurry could be divided /ˈhʌ.ri/ or /ˈhʌr.i/, but the former would result in an analysis with a syllable-final /ʌ/ (which is held to be non-occurring) while the latter would result in a syllable-final /r/ (which is said not to occur in this accent). Some phonologists have suggested a compromise analysis where the consonant in the middle belongs to both syllables, and is described as ambisyllabic. In this way, it is possible to suggest an analysis of hurry that comprises the syllables /hʌr/ and /ri/, the medial /r/ being ambisyllabic. Where the division coincides with a word boundary, or the boundary between elements of a compound word, it is not usual in the case of dictionaries to insist on the maximal onset principle in a way that divides words in a counter-intuitive way; thus the word hardware would be divided /ˈhɑː.dweə/ by the maximal onset principle, but dictionaries prefer the division /ˈhɑːd.weə/.

In the approach used by the Longman Pronunciation Dictionary, Wells claims that consonants syllabify with the preceding rather than following vowel when the preceding vowel is the nucleus of a more salient syllable, with stressed syllables being the most salient, reduced syllables the least, and full unstressed vowels ("secondary stress") intermediate. But there are lexical differences as well, frequently but not exclusively with compound words. For example, in dolphin and selfish, Wells argues that the stressed syllable ends in /lf/, but in shellfish, the /f/ belongs with the following syllable: /ˈdɒlf.ɪn, ˈself.ɪʃ/ → [ˈdɒlfɪ̈n, ˈselfɪ̈ʃ], but /ˈʃel.fɪʃ/ → [ˈʃelˑfɪʃ], where the /l/ is a little longer and the /ɪ/ is not reduced. Similarly, in toe-strap Wells argues that the second /t/ is a full plosive, as usual in syllable onset, whereas in toast-rack the second /t/ is in many dialects reduced to the unreleased allophone it takes in syllable codas, or even elided: /ˈtoʊ.stræp/, /ˈtoʊst.ræk/ → [ˈtoˑʊstɹæp, ˈtoʊs(t̚)ɹæk]; likewise nitrate /ˈnaɪtr.eɪt/ → [ˈnaɪtɹ̥eɪt] with a voiceless /r/ (and for some people an affricated tr as in tree), vs night-rate /ˈnaɪt.reɪt/ → [ˈnaɪt̚ɹeɪt] with a voiced /r/. Cues of syllable boundaries include aspiration of syllable onsets and (in the US) flapping of coda /t, d/ (a tease /ə.ˈtiːz/ → [əˈtʰiːz] vs. at ease /ət.ˈiːz/ → [əɾˈiːz]), epenthetic stops like [t] in syllable codas (fence /ˈfens/ → [ˈfents] but inside /ɪn.ˈsaɪd/ → [ɪnˈsaɪd]), and r-colored vowels when the /r/ is in the coda vs. labialization when it is in the onset (key-ring /ˈkiː.rɪŋ/ → [ˈkiːɹʷɪŋ] but fearing /ˈfiːr.ɪŋ/ → [ˈfɪəɹɪŋ]).

==== Onset ====
The following can occur as the onset:

All single-consonant phonemes except /ŋ/	
Stop plus approximant other than /j/: /pl/, /bl/, /kl/, /ɡl/, /pr/, /br/, /tr/, (Note: For certain speakers, /tr/ and /dr/ tend to affricate, so that tree resembles "chree", and dream resembles "jream". This is sometimes transcribed as [tʃɹ] and [dʒɹ], respectively, but the pronunciation varies, and may, for example, be closer to [tʂ] and [dʐ] or with a fricative release similar in quality to the rhotic, i.e. [tɹ̝̊ɹ̥], [dɹ̝ɹ], or [tʂɻ], [dʐɻ].) /dr/, /kr/, /ɡr/, /tw/, /dw/, /ɡw/, /kw/, /pw/	play, blood, clean, glove, prize, bring, tree, dream, crowd, green, twin, dwarf, Guam, quick, puissance
Voiceless fricative or /v/ plus approximant other than /j/: (Note: Some northern and insular Scottish dialects, particularly in Shetland, preserve onsets such as /ɡn/ (as in gnaw), /kn/ (as in knock), and /wr/ or /vr/ (as in write).) /fl/, /sl/, /θl/, (Note: Words beginning in unusual consonant clusters that originated in Latinized Greek loanwords tend to drop the first phoneme, as in */bd/, */fθ/, */ɡn/, */hr/, */kn/, */ks/, */kt/, */kθ/, */mn/, */pn/, */ps/, */pt/, */tm/, and */θm/, which have become /d/ (bdellium), /θ/ (phthisis), /n/ (gnome), /r/ (rhythm), /n/ (cnidoblast), /z/ (xylophone), /t/ (ctenophore), /θ/ (chthonic), /n/ (mnemonic), /n/ (pneumonia), /s/ (psychology), /t/ (pterodactyl), /m/ (tmesis), and /m/ (asthma). In some other words with these or other similar consonant clusters, the leading consonant has split off into a separate syllable; for instance, */kθ/ becoming /kə.θ/ (Cthulhu) or */fθ/ or */pθ/ becoming /pə.θ/ (phthalate). However, the onsets /sf/, /sfr/, /skl/, /sθ/, and /θl/ have remained intact.) /ʃl/, /fr/, /θr/, /ʃr/, /hw/, (Note: The onset /hw/ is simplified to /w/ in the majority of dialects (wine–whine merger).) /sw/, /θw/, /vw/	floor, sleep, thlipsis, schlep, friend, three, shrimp, what, swoon, thwart, voilà
Consonant other than /r/ or /w/ plus /j/ (before /uː/ or its modified/reduced forms): (Note: Clusters ending /j/ typically occur before /uː/ and before the CURE vowel (General American /ʊr/, RP /ʊə/); they may also come before the reduced forms /ʊ/ (as in argument) or /ə/ (as in some American pronunciations of pure and cure), and can occur before other vowels in loanwords (for instance, before /oʊ/ in jalapeño) or mimetic words (for instance, before, variably, /ɑ/, /æ/, or /ɛ/ in nyah-nyah). There is an ongoing sound change (yod-dropping) by which /j/ as the final consonant in a cluster is being lost. In RP, words with /sj/ and /lj/ can usually be pronounced with or without this sound, e.g. [suːt] or [sjuːt]. For some speakers of English, including some British speakers, the sound change is more advanced, and, so, for example, General American does not (except in loans or mimetic words) contain the onsets /tj/, /dj/, /nj/, /θj/, /sj/, /stj/, /zj/, or /lj/. Words that would otherwise begin in these onsets drop the /j/: e.g. tube (/tub/), during (/ˈdɜrɪŋ/), new (/nu/), Thule (/ˈθuli/), suit (/sut/), student (/ˈstudənt/), Zeus (/zus/), lurid (/ˈlʊrəd/). In word-medial position, these sequences can still be found in American English between a stressed and unstressed vowel (as in annual /ˈænjuəl/, failure /ˈfeɪljər/), but the consonants can be analyzed in this context as falling in separate syllables, and so not constituting a syllable onset. In some dialects, such Welsh English, /j/ may occur in more combinations; for example in /tʃj/ (chew), /dʒj/ (Jew), /ʃj/ (sure), and /slj/ (slew).) /pj/, /bj/, /tj/, /dj/, /kj/, /ɡj/, /mj/, /nj/, /fj/, /vj/, /θj/, /sj/, /zj/, /hj/, /lj/	pure, beautiful, tube, during, cute, argue, music, new, few, view, thew, suit, Zeus, huge, lurid
/s/ plus voiceless stop: (Note: After onset /s/, the contrast between fortis /p t k/ and lenis /b d g/ is neutralized. Stops in this position are typically voiceless and unaspirated: it is occasionally argued that these unaspirated stops should be transcribed as the lenis phonemes /b d g/. The intuition that words such as spin, steam, score start with /sb sd sg/ seems to be especially common for Welsh English speakers, possibly because of the importance of aspiration for distinguishing /p t k/ from /b d ɡ/ in Welsh phonology, or because of the use of the spellings ⟨sb sg⟩ in Welsh orthography.) (Note: Many clusters beginning with /ʃ/ and paralleling native clusters beginning with /s/ are found initially in German and Yiddish loanwords, such as /ʃl/, /ʃp/, /ʃt/, /ʃm/, /ʃn/, /ʃpr/, /ʃtr/ (in words such as schlep, spiel, shtick, schmuck, schnapps, Shprintzen's, strudel). /ʃw/ is found initially in the Hebrew loanword schwa. Before /r/, however, the native cluster is /ʃr/. The opposite cluster /sr/ is found in loanwords such as Sri Lanka, but this can be nativized by changing it to /ʃr/.) /sp/, /st/, /sk/	speak, stop, skill
/s/ plus nasal other than /ŋ/: /sm/, /sn/	smile, snow
/s/ plus voiceless non-sibilant fricative: /sf/, /sθ/	sphere, sthenic
/s/ plus voiceless stop plus approximant: /spl/, /skl/, /spr/, /str/, /skr/, /skw/, /spj/, /stj/, /skj/	split, sclera, spring, street, scream, square, spew, student, skewer
/s/ plus nasal plus approximant: /smj/ /snj/	smew, snew (Note: the dialectal past tense of snow, or the band with the same name)
/s/ plus voiceless non-sibilant fricative plus approximant: /sfr/	sphragistics

===== Other onsets =====
Certain English onsets appear only in contractions: e.g. /zbl/ ('sblood), and /zw/ or /dzw/ ('swounds or 'dswounds). Some, such as /pʃ/ (pshaw), /fw/ (fwoosh), or /vr/ (vroom), can occur in interjections. An archaic voiceless fricative plus nasal exists, /fn/ (fnese), as does an archaic /snj/ (snew).

Several additional onsets occur in loan words (with varying degrees of anglicization) such as /bw/ (bwana), /mw/ (moiré), /nw/ (noire), /tsw/ (zwitterion), /zw/ (zwieback), /dv/ (Dvorak), /kv/ (kvetch), /ʃv/ (schvartze), /tv/ (Tver), /tsv/ (Zwickau), /kʃ/ (Kshatriya), /tl/ (Tlaloc), /vl/ (Vladimir), /zl/ (zloty), /tsk/ (Tskhinvali), /hm/ (Hmong), /km/ (Khmer), and /ŋ/ (Nganasan).

Some clusters of this type can be converted to regular English phonotactics by simplifying the cluster: e.g. /(d)z/ (dziggetai), /(h)r/ (Hrolf), /kr(w)/ (croissant), /(ŋ)w/ (Nguyen), /(p)f/ (pfennig), /(f)θ/ (phthalic), /(t)s/ (tsunami), /(ǃ)k/ (!kung), and /k(ǁ)/ (Xhosa).

Others can be replaced by native clusters differing only in voice: /zb ~ sp/ (sbirro), and /zɡr ~ skr/ (sgraffito).

==== Nucleus ====
The following can occur as the nucleus:

- All vowel sounds
- /m/, /n/ and /l/ in certain situations (see below under word-level patterns)
- /r/ in rhotic varieties of English (e.g. General American) in certain situations (see below under word-level patterns)

==== Coda ====
Most (in theory, all) of the following except those that end with the sibilants /s/, /z/, /ʃ/, /ʒ/, /tʃ/ or /dʒ/ can be extended with /s/ or /z/ representing the morpheme -s/-z. Similarly, most (in theory, all) of the following except those that end with /t/ or /d/ can be extended with /t/ or /d/ representing the morpheme -t/-d.

Wells (1990) argues that a variety of syllable codas are possible in English, even /ntr, ndr/ in words like entry /ˈɛntr.i/ and sundry /ˈsʌndr.i/, with /tr, dr/ being treated as affricates along the lines of /tʃ, dʒ/. He argues that the traditional assumption that pre-vocalic consonants form a syllable with the following vowel is due to the influence of languages like French and Latin, where syllable structure is CVC.CVC regardless of stress placement. Disregarding such contentious cases, which do not occur at the ends of words, the following sequences can occur as the coda:

The single consonant phonemes except /h/, /w/, /j/ and, in non-rhotic varieties, /r/	
Lateral approximant plus stop or affricate: /lp/, /lb/, /lt/, /ld/, /ltʃ/, /ldʒ/, /lk/	help, bulb, belt, hold, belch, indulge, milk
In rhotic varieties, /r/ plus stop or affricate: /rp/, /rb/, /rt/, /rd/, /rtʃ/, /rdʒ/, /rk/, /rɡ/	harp, orb, fort, beard, arch, large, mark, morgue
Lateral approximant + fricative: /lf/, /lv/, /lθ/, /ls/, /lz/, /lʃ/, (/lð/)	golf, solve, wealth, else, bells, Welsh, (stealth (v.))
In rhotic varieties, /r/ + fricative: /rf/, /rv/, /rθ/, /rð/, /rs/, /rz/, /rʃ/	dwarf, carve, north, birth (v.), force, Mars, marsh
Lateral approximant + nasal: /lm/, /ln/	film, kiln
In rhotic varieties, /r/ + nasal or lateral: /rm/, /rn/, /rl/	arm, born, snarl
Nasal + homorganic stop or affricate: /mp/, /nt/, /nd/, /ntʃ/, /ndʒ/, /ŋk/; some varieties also allow /ŋg/	jump, tent, end, lunch, lounge, pink, sing
Nasal + fricative: /mf/, /mz/, /mθ/, (/nf/), /nθ/, (/ns/), /nz/, /ŋz/; some varieties also allow /ŋθ/	triumph, Thames, gloomth, (saunf), month, (prince), bronze, songs, length, strength
Voiceless fricative plus voiceless stop: /ft/, /sp/, /st/, /sk/, /ʃt/, /θt/	left, crisp, lost, ask, smashed, smithed
Voiced fricative plus voiced stop: vd, /zd/, /ðd/	lived, blazed, writhed
Two or three voiceless fricatives: /fθ/, /fθs/	fifth, fifths
Two voiceless stops: /pt/, /kt/	opt, act
Two voiceless stops + fricative: /pts/, /kts/	opts, acts
Stop plus fricative: /pθ/, /ps/, /bz/, /tθ/, /ts/, /dθ/, /dz/, /ks/, /gz/	depth, lapse, ebbs, eighth, klutz, width, adze, box, eggs
Lateral approximant + two or three consonants: /lmd/, /lpt/, /lps/, /lfθ/, /lts/, /lst/, /lkt/, /lks/	filmed, sculpt, alps, twelfth, (Note: The pronunciation of twelfth varies and can be /twɛlfθ/ or /twɛlθ/.) waltz, whilst, mulct, calx
In rhotic varieties, /r/ + two consonants: /rmd/, /rmθ/, /rpt/, /rps/, /rnd/, /rts/, /rst/, /rld/, /rkt/, /rks/	farmed, warmth, excerpt, corpse, mourned, quartz, horst, world, infarct, irks
Nasal + homorganic stop + stop or fricative: /mpt/, /mps/, /nts/, /ntθ/, /ŋkt/, /ŋks/, /ŋkθ/ in some varieties	prompt, glimpse, chintz, thousandth, distinct, jinx, length
Nasal + homorganic stop + two fricatives: /ntθs/	thousandths
Nasal + non-homorganic stop: /mt/, /md/, /ŋd/	dreamt, hemmed, hanged
Three obstruents: /ksθ/, /kst/	sixth, next
Four obstruents: /ksθs/, /ksθt/, /ksts/	sixths, sixthed, texts

- Notes:

For some speakers, a fricative before /θ/ is elided so that these never appear phonetically: /fɪfθ/ becomes [fɪθ], /sɪksθ/ becomes [sɪkθ], /twɛlfθ/ becomes [twɛlθ].

=== Syllable-level patterns ===
- Syllables may consist of a single vowel, meaning that onset and coda are not mandatory.
- The consonant /ŋ/ does not occur in syllable-initial position (most speakers do not maintain it even in loans like Ngorongoro and Nguyen).
- The consonant /h/ does not occur in syllable-final position.
- Onset clusters ending in /j/ are followed by /uː/ or its variants (see § Onset note e above).
- Long vowels and diphthongs are not found before /ŋ/, except for the mimetic words boing and oink, unassimilated foreign words such as Burmese aung and proper names such as Taung, and American-type pronunciations of words like strong (which have /ɔŋ/ or /ɑŋ/). The short vowels /ɛ, ʊ/ occur before /ŋ/ only in assimilated non-native words such as ginseng and Song (name of a Chinese dynasty) or non-finally in some dialects in words like strength and length as well as in varieties without the foot-strut split.
- /ʊ/ is rare in syllable-initial position (although in the northern half of England, [ʊ] is used for /ʌ/ and is common at the start of syllables).
- Stop + /w/ before /uː, ʊ, ʌ, aʊ/ (all presently or historically /u(ː)/) are excluded.
- Sequences of /s/ + C_{1} + V̆ + C_{1}, where both C_{1}'s are the same consonant and V̆ is a short vowel (e.g. *spip, *scock, *smam), are virtually nonexistent, except when C_{1} is /t/ (e.g. stat, stot).

=== Word-level patterns ===
- /ə/ does not occur in stressed syllables, unless it is merged with another vowel as in some varieties.
- /ʒ/ does not occur in word-initial position in native English words, although it can occur syllable-initially as in luxurious /lʌɡˈʒʊəriəs/ in American English, and at the start of borrowed words such as genre.
- /m/, /n/, /l/ and, in rhotic varieties, /r/ can be the syllable nucleus (i.e. a syllabic consonant) in an unstressed syllable following another consonant, especially /t/, /d/, /s/ or /z/. Such syllables are often analyzed phonemically as having an underlying /ə/ as the nucleus. See above under Consonants.
- The short vowels are checked vowels, in that they cannot occur without a coda in a word-final stressed syllable. (This does not apply to /ə/, which does not occur in stressed syllables as mentioned above.)

== Prosody ==
The prosodic features of English – stress, rhythm, and intonation – can be described as follows.

=== Prosodic stress ===
Prosodic stress is extra stress given to words or syllables when they appear in certain positions in an utterance, or when they receive special emphasis.

According to Ladefoged's analysis (as referred to under § Lexical stress above), English normally has prosodic stress on the final stressed syllable in an intonation unit. This is said to be the origin of the distinction traditionally made at the lexical level between primary and secondary stress: when a word like admiration (traditionally transcribed as something like /ˌædmɪˈreɪʃən/) is spoken in isolation, or at the end of a sentence, the syllable ra (the final stressed syllable) is pronounced with greater force than the syllable ad, although when the word is not pronounced with this final intonation there may be no difference between the levels of stress of these two syllables.

Prosodic stress can shift for various pragmatic functions, such as focus or contrast. For instance, in the dialogue Is it brunch tomorrow? No, it's dinner tomorrow, the extra stress shifts from the last stressed syllable of the sentence, tomorrow, to the last stressed syllable of the emphasized word, dinner.

Grammatical function words are usually prosodically unstressed, although they can acquire stress when emphasized (as in Did you find the cat? Well, I found a cat). Many English function words have distinct strong and weak pronunciations; for example, the word a in the last example is pronounced /eɪ/, while the more common unstressed a is pronounced /ə/. See Weak and strong forms in English.

=== Rhythm ===
English is claimed to be a stress-timed language. That is, stressed syllables tend to appear with a more or less regular rhythm, while non-stressed syllables are shortened to accommodate this. For example, in the sentence One make of car is better than another, the syllables one, make, car, bett- and -noth- will be stressed and relatively long, while the other syllables will be considerably shorter. The theory of stress-timing predicts that each of the three unstressed syllables in between bett- and -noth- will be shorter than the syllable of between make and car, because three syllables must fit into the same amount of time as that available for of. However, it should not be assumed that all varieties of English are stress-timed in this way. The English spoken in the West Indies, in Africa and in India are probably better characterized as syllable-timed, though the lack of an agreed scientific test for categorizing an accent or language as stress-timed or syllable-timed may lead one to doubt the value of such a characterization.

=== Intonation ===
Phonological contrasts in intonation can be said to be found in three different and independent domains. In the work of Halliday the following names are proposed:

- Tonality for the distribution of continuous speech into tone groups.
- Tonicity for the placing of the principal accent on a particular syllable of a word, making it the tonic syllable. This is the domain also referred to as prosodic stress or sentence stress.
- Tone for the choice of pitch movement on the tonic syllable. (The use of the term tone in this sense should not be confused with the tone of tone languages, such as Chinese.)

These terms ("the Three Ts") have been used in more recent work, though they have been criticized for being difficult to remember. American systems such as ToBI also identify contrasts involving boundaries between intonation phrases (Halliday's tonality), placement of pitch accent (tonicity), and choice of tone or tones associated with the pitch accent (tone).

Example of phonological contrast involving placement of intonation unit boundaries (boundary marked by comma):

1. Those who ran quickly, escaped. (the only people who escaped were those who ran quickly)
2. Those who ran, quickly escaped. (the people who ran escaped quickly)

Example of phonological contrast involving placement of tonic syllable (marked by capital letters):

1. I have plans to LEAVE. (= I am planning to leave)
2. I have PLANS to leave. (= I have some drawings to leave)

Example of phonological contrast (British English) involving choice of tone (\ = falling tone, \/ = fall-rise tone)

1. She didn't break the record because of the \ WIND. (= she did not break the record, because the wind held her up)
2. She didn't break the record because of the \/ WIND. (= she did break the record, but not because of the wind)

There is typically a contrast involving tone between wh-questions and yes/no questions, the former having a falling tone (e.g. "Where did you \PUT it?") and the latter a rising tone (e.g. "Are you going /OUT?"), though studies of spontaneous speech have shown frequent exceptions to this rule. Tag questions asking for information are said to carry rising tones (e.g. "They are coming on Tuesday, /AREN'T they?") while those asking for confirmation have falling tone (e.g. "Your name's John, \ISN'T it.").

== History of English pronunciation ==
The pronunciation system of English has undergone many changes throughout the history of the language, from the phonological system of Old English, to that of Middle English, through to that of the present day. Variation between dialects has always been significant. Former pronunciations of many words are reflected in their spellings, as English orthography has generally not kept pace with phonological changes since the Middle English period.

The English consonant system has been relatively stable over time, although a number of significant changes have occurred. Examples include the loss (in most dialects) of the [ç] and [x] sounds still reflected by the ⟨gh⟩ in words like night and taught, and the splitting of voiced and voiceless allophones of fricatives into separate phonemes (such as the two different phonemes represented by ⟨th⟩). There have also been many changes in consonant clusters, mostly reductions, for instance those that produced the usual modern pronunciations of such letter combinations as ⟨wr-⟩, ⟨kn-⟩ and ⟨wh-⟩.

The development of vowels has been much more complex. One of the most notable series of changes is that known as the Great Vowel Shift, which began around the late 14th century. Here the [iː] and [uː] in words like price and mouth became diphthongized, and other long vowels became higher: [eː] became [iː] (as in meet), [aː] became [eː] and later [eɪ] (as in name), [oː] became [uː] (as in goose), and [ɔː] became [oː] and later [oʊ] (in RP now [əʊ]; as in bone). These shifts are responsible for the modern pronunciations of many written vowel combinations, including those involving a silent final ⟨e⟩.

Many other changes in vowels have taken place over the centuries (see the separate articles on the low back, high back and high front vowels, short A, and diphthongs). These various changes mean that many words that formerly rhymed (and may be expected to rhyme based on their spelling) no longer do. For example, in Shakespeare's time, following the Great Vowel Shift, food, good and blood all had the vowel [uː], but in modern pronunciation good has been shortened to [ʊ], while blood has been shortened and lowered to [ʌ] in most accents. In other cases, words that were formerly distinct have come to be pronounced the same – examples of such mergers include meet–meat, pane–pain and toe–tow.

== Controversial issues ==
=== Velar nasal ===
The phonemic status of the velar nasal consonant [ŋ] is disputed; one analysis claims that the only nasal phonemes in English are /m/ and /n/, while [ŋ] is an allophone of /n/ found before velar consonants. Evidence in support of this analysis is found in accents of the north-west Midlands of England where [ŋ] is found only before /k/ or /ɡ/, with sung being pronounced as [sʌŋɡ]. However, in most other accents of English sung is pronounced [sʌŋ], producing a three-way phonemic contrast sum – sun – sung /sʌm sʌn sʌŋ/ and supporting the analysis of the phonemic status of /ŋ/. In support of treating the velar nasal as an allophone of /n/, Sapir (1925) claims on psychological grounds that [ŋ] did not form part of a series of three nasal consonants: "no naïve English-speaking person can be made to feel in his bones that it belongs to a single series with m and n. ... It still feels like ƞg." More recent writers have indicated that analyses of [ŋ] as an allophone of /n/ may still have merit, even though [ŋ] may appear both with and without a following velar consonant; in such analyses, an underlying /ɡ/ that is deleted by a phonological rule would account for occurrences of [ŋ] not followed by a velar consonant. Thus the phonemic representation of sing would be /sɪnɡ/ and that of singer is /ˈsɪnɡə/; in order to reach the phonetic form [sɪŋ] and [ˈsɪŋə], it is necessary to apply a rule that changes /n/ to [ŋ] before /k/ or /ɡ/, then a second rule that deletes /ɡ/ when it follows [ŋ].

- 1. /n/ → [ŋ] / ____ velar consonant
- 2. /ɡ/ → ∅ / [ŋ] _____

These produce the following results:

Word	Underlying phonological form	Phonetic form
sing	/sɪnɡ/	[sɪŋ]
singer	/ˈsɪnɡər/	[ˈsɪŋər]
singing	/ˈsɪnɡɪnɡ/	[ˈsɪŋɪŋ]

However, these rules do not predict the following phonetic forms:

Word	Underlying phonological form	Phonetic form
anger	/ˈænɡər/	[ˈæŋɡər]
finger	/ˈfɪnɡər/	[ˈfɪŋɡər]
hunger	/ˈhʌnɡər/	[ˈhʌŋɡər]

In the above cases, the /ɡ/ is not deleted. The words are all single morphemes, unlike singer and singing which are composed of two morphemes, sing plus -er or -ing. Rule 2 can be amended to include a symbol # for a morpheme boundary (including word boundary):

2. /ɡ/ → ∅ / [ŋ] ___ #

This rule then applies to sing, singer and singing but not to anger, finger, or hunger.

According to this rule, the words hangar ('shed for aircraft'), which contains no internal morpheme boundary, and hanger ('object for hanging clothes'), which comprises two morphemes, are expected to constitute a minimal pair as hangar [ˈhæŋɡə] versus hanger [ˈhæŋə]; in actuality, their pronunciations are not consistently distinguished in this manner, as hangar is frequently pronounced [ˈhæŋə].

Additionally, there are exceptions in the form of comparative and superlative forms of adjectives, where Rule 2 must be prevented from applying. The ending -ish is another possible exception.

Word	Underlying phonological form	Phonetic form
long	/lɒnɡ/	[lɒŋ]
longer	/ˈlɒnɡər/	[ˈlɒŋɡər]
longest	/ˈlɒnɡɪst/	[ˈlɒŋɡəst]
longish	/ˈlɒnɡɪʃ/	[ˈlɒŋɡɪʃ] or [ˈlɒŋɪʃ]

As a result, there is, in theory, a minimal pair consisting of longer ([ˈlɒŋɡər] 'more long') and longer ([ˈlɒŋər] 'person who longs'), though it is doubtful that native speakers make this distinction regularly. Names of persons and places, and loanwords, are less predictable. Singapore may be pronounced with or without [ɡ]; bungalow usually has [ɡ]; and Inge may or may not have [ɡ].

=== Vowel system ===
It is often stated that English has a particularly large number of vowel phonemes and that there are 20 vowel phonemes in Received Pronunciation, 14–16 in General American, and 20–21 in Australian English. These numbers, however, reflect just one of many possible phonological analyses. A number of "biphonemic" analyses have proposed that English has a basic set of short (sometimes called "simple" or "checked") vowels, each of which can be shown to be a phoneme and can be combined with another phoneme to form long vowels and diphthongs. One of these biphonemic analyses asserts that diphthongs and long vowels may be interpreted as comprising a short vowel linked to a consonant. The fullest exposition of this approach is found in Trager & Smith (1951), where all long vowels and diphthongs ("complex nuclei") are made up of a short vowel combined with either /j/ (for which the authors use the symbol ⟨y⟩), /w/ or /h/ (plus /r/ for rhotic accents), each thus comprising two phonemes. Using this system, the word bite would be transcribed /bajt/, bout as /bawt/, bar as /bar/ and bra as /brah/. One attraction that the authors claim for this analysis is that it regularizes the distribution of the consonants /j/, /w/, and /h/ (as well as /r/ in non-rhotic accents), which would otherwise not be found in syllable-final position. Trager & Smith (1951) suggest nine simple vowel phonemes to allow them to represent all the accents of American and British English they surveyed, symbolized /i, e, æ/ (front vowels); /ᵻ, ə, a/ (central vowels); and /u, o, ɔ/ (back vowels).

The analysis from Trager & Smith (1951) came out of a desire to build an "overall system" to accommodate all English dialects, with dialectal distinctions arising from differences in the ordering of phonological rules, as well as in the presence or absence of such rules. Another category of biphonemic analyses of English treats long vowels and diphthongs as conjunctions of two vowels. Such analyses, as found in Sweet (1877) or Kreidler (2004) for example, are less concerned with dialectal variation. In MacCarthy (1967:4, 36–37), for example, there are seven basic vowels and these may be doubled (geminated) to represent long vowels, as shown in the table below:

Short vowel	Long vowel
i (bit)	ii (beet)
e (bet)	
a (cat)	aa (cart)
o (cot)	oo (caught)
u (pull)	uu (pool)
ʌ (cut)	
ə (collect)	əə (curl)

Some of the short vowels may also be combined with /i/ (/ei/ bay, /ai/ buy, /oi/ boy), with /u/ (/au/ bough, /ou/ beau) or with /ə/ (/iə/ peer, /eə/ pair, /uə/ poor). The vowel inventory of English RP in MacCarthy's system therefore totals only seven phonemes. (Analyses such as these could also posit six vowel phonemes, if the vowel of the final syllable in comma is considered to be an unstressed allophone of that of strut.) These seven vowels might be symbolized /i/, /e/, /a/, /o/, /u/, /ʌ/ and /ə/. Six or seven vowels is a figure that would put English much closer to the average number of vowel phonemes in other languages.

A radically different approach to the English vowel system was proposed by Chomsky and Halle. Their Sound Pattern of English (Chomsky & Halle 1968) proposed that English has lax and tense vowel phonemes, which are operated on by a complex set of phonological rules to transform underlying phonological forms into surface phonetic representations. This generative analysis is not easily comparable with conventional analyses, but the total number of vowel phonemes proposed falls well short of the figure of 20 often claimed as the number of English vowel phonemes.

== See also ==
- Australian English phonology
- English orthography
- English pronunciation of Greek letters
- General American
- Non-native pronunciations of English
- Old English phonology
- Perception of English /r/ and /l/ by Japanese speakers
- Phonological development
- Phonological history of English vowels
- Phonological history of English consonants
- Pronunciation of English ⟨th⟩
- Received Pronunciation
- Regional accents of English
- Rhoticity in English
- T-glottalization
- R-colored vowel
- Sound correspondences between English accents
- Category:Splits and mergers in English phonology
