= Stress and vowel reduction in English =

Phonetic phenomenon

Stress is a prominent feature of the English language, both at the level of the word (lexical stress) and at the level of the phrase or sentence (prosodic stress). Absence of stress on a syllable, or on a word in some cases, is frequently associated in English with vowel reduction – many such syllables are pronounced with a centralized vowel (schwa) or with certain other vowels that are described as being "reduced" (or sometimes with a syllabic consonant as the syllable nucleus rather than a vowel). Various contradictory phonological analyses exist for these phenomena.

For example, in the following sentence, a speaker would typically pronounce have with a schwa, as /həv/ or /əv/:

Alice and Bob have arrived.

But in other contexts where the word carries stress, it would be pronounced in its "strong" (unreduced) form as /hæv/. For example:

Have Alice and Bob arrived?
[In response to the question "Have Alice and Bob arrived?"] They have.

== Lexical and prosodic stress ==
Lexical stress (word stress) is regarded as phonemic in English; the position of the stress is generally unpredictable and can serve to distinguish words. For example, the words insight and incite are distinguished in pronunciation only by the syllable being stressed. In insight, the stress is placed on the first syllable; and in incite, on the second. Similarly, the noun and the verb increase are distinguished by the placement of the stress in the same way – this is an example of an initial-stress-derived noun.

Moreover, even within a given letter sequence and a given part of speech, lexical stress may distinguish between different words or between different meanings of the same word (depending on differences in theory about what constitutes a distinct word): for example, initial-stress pronunciations of offense /ˈɔfɛns/ and defense /ˈdifɛns/ in American English denote concepts specific to sports, whereas pronunciations with stress on the words' respective second syllables (offense /əˈfɛns/ and defense /dəˈfɛns/) denote concepts fundamentally related to the legal (and, for defense, the military) field and encountered in sports only as borrowed from the legal field in the context of adjudicating rule violations. British English stresses the second syllable in both sports and legal use.

Some words are shown in dictionaries as having two levels of stress: primary and secondary. For example, the RP pronunciation of organization may be given as /ˌɔːɡənaɪˈzeɪʃən/, with primary stress on the fourth syllable, secondary stress on the first syllable, and the remaining syllables unstressed. For different ways of analysing levels of stress in English, see § Degrees of lexical stress below.

English also has relatively strong prosodic stress—particular words within a phrase or sentence receive additional stress to emphasize the information they convey. There is also said to be a natural "tonic stress" that falls on the last stressed syllable of a prosodic unit – for more on this, see below under § Descriptions with only one level of stress.

English is classified as a stress-timed language, which means that there is a tendency to speak so that the stressed syllables come at roughly equal intervals. See Isochrony § Stress timing.

== Reduced vowels ==
Certain vowel sounds in English are associated strongly with absence of stress: they occur practically exclusively in unstressed syllables, and conversely, most (though not all) unstressed syllables contain one of these sounds. These are known as reduced vowels, and tend to be characterized by such features as shortness, laxness and central position. (An alternative term is weak vowels.) The exact set of reduced vowels depends on dialect and speaker; the principal ones are described in the sections below.

=== Schwa and r-coloured schwa ===
Schwa, [ə], is the most common reduced vowel in English. It may be represented in spelling by any of the vowel letters, such as the a in about, the o in harmony, the u in medium, the e in synthesis, the i in decimal or the y in analysis (although the last three are pronounced instead as a near-close vowel by some speakers – see the following section).

In many rhotic dialects, an r-colored schwa, [ɚ], occurs in words such as water and standard. The r-colored schwa can be analyzed phonemically as /ər/.

=== Reduced vowels in the close unrounded area ===
Dictionary transcription conventions for [ɪ ~ ə] (schwi)

LDOCE convention

OED convention

In some dialects of English there is a distinction between two vowel heights of reduced vowels: in addition to schwa, there is a distinct near-close central unrounded vowel [ɪ̈] (or equivalently [ɨ̞]). In the British phonetic tradition, the latter vowel is represented with the symbol ⟨ɪ⟩, and in the American tradition ⟨ɨ⟩. An example of a minimal pair contrasting these two reduced vowels is Rosa's vs. roses: the a in Rosa's is a schwa, while the e in roses (for speakers who make the distinction) is the near-close vowel. See weak vowel merger.

Like schwa, [ɪ̈] does not correspond in spelling to any single vowel letter. It can be represented by a (for example, message [ˈmɛsɪ̈dʒ], climate [ˈklaɪmɪ̈t], orange [ˈɒɹɪ̈ndʒ]), e (puppet), i (limit), u (minute), or y (polyp).

Among speakers who make this distinction, the distributions of schwa and [ɪ̈] are quite variable, and in many cases the two are in free variation: the i in decimal, for example, may be pronounced with either sound. A symbolization convention recently introduced by Oxford University Press for some of their English dictionaries uses the non-IPA "compound" symbol ⟨ᵻ⟩ (~~ɪ~~) in words that may be pronounced anywhere between /ɪ/ or /ə/ (including [ɪ̈] and [ɘ]); for example, the word noted is transcribed /ˈnəʊtᵻd/. This indeterminate vowel is sometimes called schwi. Webster's Third uses ⟨ə̇⟩ for schwi in words like habit \ˈhabə̇t\, and thus which the online Merriam-Webster dictionary still uses in some words such as depositor \də̇ˈpäzə̇tə(r)\, exposedness \ikˈspōz(ə̇)dnə̇s\, and Ryukyu \rə̇ˈ(y)ü(ˌ)kyü\.

The final vowel of words like happy and coffee is an unstressed front close unrounded vowel most commonly represented with [i], although some dialects (including more traditional Received Pronunciation) may have [ɪ]. This [i] used to be identified with the phoneme /iː/, as in FLEECE. See happy tensing. However, some contemporary accounts regard it as a symbol representing a close front vowel that is neither the vowel of KIT nor that of FLEECE; it occurs in contexts where the contrast between these vowels is neutralized; these contexts include unstressed prevocalic position within the word, such as react /riˈækt/. For some speakers, however, there is a contrast between this vowel and /ɪ/ in such pairs as taxis vs. taxes and studied vs. studded. See English phonology § Unstressed syllables.

=== Reduced vowels in the close rounded area ===
Dictionary transcription conventions for [ʊ ~ ə] (schwu)

LDOCE convention

OED convention

According to Bolinger (1986:347–360), there is a reduced rounded phoneme /ɵ/ as in willow /ˈwɪlɵ/ or omission /ɵˈmɪʃən/, thus forming a three-way contrast with Willa /ˈwɪlə/ and Willie /ˈwɪlɨ/ or with a mission /ə ˈmɪʃən/ and emission /ɨˈmɪʃən/. This phoneme alternates with the goat vowel /oʊ ~ əʊ/.

Analogously to the ⟨ᵻ⟩ symbol mentioned above, Oxford University Press have devised the non-IPA symbol ⟨ᵿ⟩ to represent a vowel that may be anywhere between /ʊ/ and /ə/ (including [ʊ̈] and [ɵ]) in free variation; for example, awful /ˈɔːfᵿl/ may be pronounced /ˈɔːfəl/ or /ˈɔːfʊl/. Phonologically, this vowel is an archiphoneme representing the neutralization of /ʊ/ and /ə/. This indeterminate vowel is sometimes called schwu.

A rounded vowel [u], corresponding to the [i] happY vowel, is widely used in British works for words such as influence /ˈɪnfluəns/, into /ˈɪntu/. Phonologically, this vowel is an archiphoneme representing the neutralization of /uː/ and /ʊ/.

=== Syllabic consonants ===
The other sounds that can serve as the peaks of reduced syllables are the syllabic consonants, which can result in syllables with no vowel sound. Alternative pronunciations of syllabic consonants are however also possible. For example, cycle may be pronounced as either [ˈsaɪkɫ̩] with only a dark l sound or as [ˈsaɪkəɫ] with a schwa followed by the dark l sound.

In other words, a syllabic consonant can be phonologically analyzed as consisting of either just the consonant or of an underlying schwa followed by the consonant. The consonants that can be syllabic in English are principally /l/, /m/, and /n/, for example in cycle (spelled by L followed by a silent e), prism, and prison. In rhotic accents, /ɜr/ and /ər/ are also pronounced as syllabic [ɹ] or [ɻ].

== Unstressed full vowels ==
All full (unreduced; also called strong) vowels may occur in unstressed position (except under theoretical approaches that routinely assign secondary or tertiary stress to syllables containing such vowels – see § Degrees of lexical stress below). Some examples of words with unstressed syllables that are often pronounced with full vowels in Received Pronunciation are given below (pronunciation may be different in other varieties of English).

- Unreduced short vowels: /ɛ/ in the final syllable of document when used as a verb (compare the /ə/ heard when the word is used as a noun); /æ/ in the first syllable of ambition; /ɒ/ in the second syllable of neon; /ʌ/ in words with the negative prefix un-, such as unknown (compare /ə/ in until).
- Long vowels: /ɑː/ in the final syllable of grandma; /ɔː/ in the final syllable of outlaw; /uː/ in tofu; /ɜː/ in the noun convert; /iː/ in manatee. Note that this last may stand in contrast to the happY vowel found at the end of humanity. This contrast is further described under § Distinctions between reduced and unreduced vowels below.
- Diphthongs: /eɪ/ in Monday; /oʊ/ in piano; /aʊ/ in discount; /aɪ/ in idea; /ɔɪ/ in royale.

Many other full unstressed vowels also derive historically from stressed vowels, due to shifts of stress over time, such as stress shifting away from the final syllable of French loan words, like ballet and bureau, in British English though not American English, or the loss or change of stress in compound phrases (as in óverseas vóyage from overséas plus vóyage). There is a tendency, though, for such vowels to become reduced over time, especially in very common words.

With vowels represented as ⟨ɪ⟩ and ⟨ʊ⟩, it may be hard to ascertain whether they represent a full vowel or a reduced vowel. A word that illustrates this challenge is chauvinism, where the first i is either the reduced vowel /ɨ/ or the unreduced /ɪ/, while the second is definitively the unreduced /ɪ/.

=== Compound words ===
Full vowels are commonly, but not always, preserved in unstressed syllables in compound words, such as in bedsheet, moonlit, tentpeg, snowman, and kettledrum. However, in some compounds that are used fairly frequently and therefore more familiarly, the vowel of the unstressed part may be reduced in contrast to compounds that are not: thus, postman /ˈpoʊstmən/ but snowman /ˈsnoʊmæn/; England /ˈɪŋɡlənd/ but Thailand /ˈtaɪlænd/; cupboard /ˈkʌbərd/ but blackboard /ˈblækbɔːrd/.

== Degrees of lexical stress ==
=== Descriptions with primary and secondary stress ===
In many phonological approaches, and in many dictionaries, English is represented as having two levels of stress: primary and secondary. In every lexical word, and in some grammatical words, one syllable is identified as having primary stress, though in monosyllables the stress is not generally marked. In addition, longer words may have one or more syllables identified as having secondary stress. Syllables that have neither primary nor secondary stress are called unstressed.

In International Phonetic Alphabet transcriptions, primary stress is denoted with ⟨ˈ⟩ and secondary stress with ⟨ˌ⟩. IPA stress marks are placed before the stressed syllable. When citing words in English spelling, primary stress is sometimes denoted with an acute accent ⟨´⟩ and secondary stress with a grave accent ⟨`⟩, placed over the vowel of the stressed syllable.

Secondary stress is frequently indicated in the following cases:

- In words where the primary stress falls on the third syllable or later, it is normal for secondary stress to be marked on one of the first two syllables of the word. In words where the primary stress falls on the third syllable, secondary stress usually falls on the first rather than the second syllable. For example, ìnterjéction and èvolútion have their primary stress on the third syllable, and secondary stress on the first syllable. However, in certain words with primary stress on the third syllable, the second syllable may have secondary stress corresponding to the primary stress of a shorter related word or base. For example, electricity is pronounced by some speakers with secondary stress on the second syllable (elèctrícity), corresponding to the primary stress in eléctric. In words where the primary stress falls on the fourth syllable or later, the position of the secondary stress on either the first or second syllable often corresponds to the position of the primary stress in a shorter related word or base. For example, òrganizátion and assòciátion, which both have primary stress on the fourth syllable, have secondary stress on the first and second syllable respectively: the same positions as the primary stress on the first syllable of organize and the second syllable of associate.
- In words where the primary stress falls on the third or fourth syllable from the end, a following syllable may be marked with secondary stress.
- In many compound words, the stressed syllable of the prominent part of the compound is marked with primary stress, while the stressed syllable of the other part may be marked with secondary stress. For example, còunterintélligence /ˌkaʊntər.ɪnˈtɛlɪdʒəns/, and cóunterfòil /ˈkaʊntərˌfɔɪl/. Dictionaries are not always consistent in this, particularly when the secondary stress would come after the primary – for instance the foil of counterfoil is transcribed with secondary stress in Merriam-Webster dictionaries but not in the OED, although both of them assign secondary stress to the counter of counterintelligence.
- In some dictionaries (particularly American ones), all syllables that contain a full (unreduced) vowel are ascribed at least secondary stress, even when they come after the primary stress (as in the counterfoil example above). Bolinger (1986:358–360) notes that such dictionaries make use of the secondary-stress mark to distinguish full vowels from reduced vowels in unstressed syllables, as they may not have distinct symbols for reduced vowels. John Wells remarks, "Some analysts (particularly Americans) argue [...] that the presence of a strong [= full] vowel is sufficient evidence that the syllable in question is stressed. In the British tradition we regard them as unstressed."

Note that this last-mentioned group of syllables are those ascribed tertiary stress in the approach described in the next section.

=== Descriptions with primary, secondary and tertiary stress ===
In some theories, English has been described as having three levels of stress: primary, secondary, and tertiary (in addition to the unstressed level, which in this approach may also be called quaternary stress). For example,²coun.ter.³in.¹tel.li.gence has a primary, secondary, and tertiary stress, and ¹coun.ter.³foil has a primary and tertiary stress. Exact treatments vary, but it is common for tertiary stress to be assigned to those syllables that, while not assigned primary or secondary stress, nonetheless contain full vowels (unreduced vowels, i.e., those not among the reduced vowels listed in the previous section). Dictionaries do not generally mark tertiary stress, but as mentioned above, some of them treat all syllables with unreduced vowels as having at least secondary stress.

=== Descriptions with only one level of stress ===
Phoneticians such as Peter Ladefoged have noted that it is possible to describe English with only one degree of stress, as long as unstressed syllables are phonemically distinguished for vowel reduction. According to this view, the posited multiple levels, whether primary–secondary or primary–secondary–tertiary, are mere phonetic detail and not true phonemic stress. They report that often the alleged secondary (or tertiary) stress in English is not characterized by the increase in respiratory activity normally associated with primary stress in English or with all stress in other languages. In their analysis, an English syllable may be either stressed or unstressed, and if unstressed, the vowel may be either full or reduced. This is all that is required for a phonemic treatment.

The difference between what is normally called primary and secondary stress, in this analysis, is explained by the observation that the last stressed syllable in a normal prosodic unit receives additional intonational or "tonic" stress. Since a word spoken in isolation, in citation form (as for example when a lexicographer determines which syllables are stressed) acquires this additional tonic stress, it may appear to be inherent in the word itself rather than derived from the utterance in which the word occurs. (The tonic stress may also occur elsewhere than on the final stressed syllable, if the speaker uses contrasting or other prosody.)

This combination of lexical stress, phrase- or clause-final prosody, and the lexical reduction of some unstressed vowels, conspires to create the impression of multiple levels of stress. In Ladefoged's approach, our examples are transcribed phonemically as cóunterintélligence /ˈkaʊntər.ɪnˈtɛlɪdʒəns/, with two stressed syllables, and cóunterfoil /ˈkaʊntərfɔɪl/, with one. In citation form, or at the end of a prosodic unit (marked [‖]), extra stress appears from the utterance that is not inherent in the words themselves: cóunterintélligence [ˈkaʊntər.ɪnˈˈtɛlɪdʒəns‖] and cóunterfoil [ˈˈkaʊntərfɔɪl‖].

To determine where the actual lexical stress is in a word, one may try pronouncing the word in a phrase, with other words before and after it and without any pauses between them, to eliminate the effects of tonic stress: in the còunterintèlligence commúnity, for example, one can hear secondary (that is, lexical) stress on two syllables of counterintelligence, as the primary (tonic) stress has shifted to community.

=== Comparison ===
The following table summarizes the relationships between the aforementioned analyses of levels of stress in English: Ladefoged's binary account (which recognizes only one level of lexical stress), a quaternary account (which recognizes primary, secondary and tertiary stress), and typical dictionary approaches (which recognize primary and secondary stress, although their interpretations of secondary stress vary).

Description	Example	Binary approach	Quaternary approach	Dictionary approaches
The most prominent syllable when a word is spoken alone.	organization	Stressed	Primary stress	Primary stress
Other phonetically prominent syllables in a word.	organization	Stressed	Secondary stress	Secondary stress
Other syllables with unreduced vowels.	counterfoil	Unstressed	Tertiary stress	Secondary stress (esp. U.S.) or unstressed
Syllables with reduced vowels.	counterfoil	Unstressed	Unstressed (quaternary stress)	Unstressed

As described in the section above, the binary account explains the distinction observed between "primary" and "secondary" stress as resulting from the prosodic, tonic stress that naturally falls on the final stressed syllable in a unit. It also recognizes the distinction between unstressed syllables with full vowels, and unstressed syllables with reduced vowels, but considers this to be a difference involving vowel reduction and not one of stress.

== Distinctions between reduced and unreduced vowels ==
As mentioned in the previous section, some linguists postulate a phonemic distinction between syllables that contain reduced vowels (as listed above – syllabic consonants are also included in this category), and those that contain full (unreduced) vowels, despite being unstressed. This approach is taken by linguists such as Ladefoged and Bolinger, who thus consider that there are two "tiers" of vowels in English, full and reduced. The reduced/unreduced distinction is regarded as one of vowel quality not involving any difference in stress. (This contrasts with analyses that ascribe secondary or tertiary stress to syllables with unreduced vowels.)

This distinction can be used to explain the (potential) contrast between the final vowel of words such as humanity, chicory, shivery, which may end with reduced /ɨ/, and that of manatee, chickaree, shivaree, which may end with unreduced /iː/. Another example, for some speakers, is provided by the words farrow and Pharaoh; the former may end with a reduced /ɵ/ while the latter may end with the unreduced /oʊ/. Alternatively, these reduced vowels can be analyzed as instances of the same phonemes as full vowels. In that case, it may be the phonemic secondary stress that distinguishes these words.

Potential distinction between reduced vowels and unstressed full vowels
	Reduced vowel set	Secondary stress	No distinction
shivery – shivaree	/ˈʃɪvərɨ – ˈʃɪvəriː/	/ˈʃɪvəriː – ˈʃɪvəˌriː/	/ˈʃɪvəriː/ (both)
farrow – Pharaoh	/ˈfærɵ – ˈfæroʊ/	/ˈfæroʊ – ˈfæˌroʊ/	/ˈfæroʊ/ (both)

Some linguists have observed phonetic consequences of vowel reduction that go beyond the pronunciation of the vowel itself. Bolinger (1986) observes that a preceding voiceless stop is likely to retain its aspiration before an unstressed full vowel, but not before a reduced vowel; and that flapping of /t/ and /d/ in American English is possible before a reduced vowel but not before a full vowel. Hence the /t/ in manatee would be an aspirated [tʰ], while that in humanity would be unaspirated [t] or a flap [ɾ]. Wells (1990) explains such phenomena by claiming that, in the absence of morpheme boundaries or phonotactical constraints, a consonant between a full and a reduced vowel generally belongs to the syllable with the full vowel, whereas a consonant between two reduced vowels belongs to the preceding syllable. According to this analysis, manatee is /ˈmæn.ə.tiː/ and humanity is /hjʊ.ˈmæn.ᵻt.i/; it is then asserted that voiceless stops are only aspirated at the beginning of syllables, and /t/ can only be flapped at the end of a syllable (as in might I /maɪt.aɪ/ → [mʌɪɾaɪ] versus my tie /maɪ.taɪ/ → [maɪtʰaɪ]).

== Alternation between full and reduced vowels ==
Reduced vowels frequently alternate with full vowels: a given word or morpheme may be pronounced with a reduced vowel in some instances and a full vowel in other instances, usually depending on the degree of stress (lexical or prosodic) given to it.

=== Alternation depending on lexical stress ===
When the stress pattern of words changes, the vowels in certain syllables may switch between full and reduced. For example, in photograph and photographic, where the first syllable has (at least secondary) stress and the second syllable is unstressed, the first o is pronounced with a full vowel (the diphthong of GOAT), and the second o with a reduced vowel (schwa). However, in photography and photographer, where the stress moves to the second syllable, the first syllable now contains schwa while the second syllable contains a full vowel (that of LOT).

=== Alternation depending on meaning ===
A number of English verb-adjective pairs are distinguished solely by vowel reduction. For example, in some dialects, separate as a verb (as in 'what separates nation from nation') has a full vowel in the final syllable, [ˈsɛpəreɪt], whereas the corresponding adjective (as in 'they sleep in separate rooms') has a reduced vowel: [ˈsɛpərət] or [ˈsɛprət]. A distinction may be made in a similar way between a verb and a noun, as in the case of document (pronounced with a schwa in the noun's final syllable and sometimes pronounced with a full vowel /ɛ/ in the verb's final syllable). Finally, differences in syllabic stress and vowel reduction (or lack of the latter) may distinguish between meanings even within a given part of speech, with the best-known such pairs in American English being offense and defense (in each case with the first syllable accented in the context of sports and the second syllable accented in legal contexts).

=== Alternation depending on type of enunciation ===
In some words, the reduction of a vowel depends on how quickly or carefully the speaker enunciates the word. For example, the o in obscene is commonly reduced to schwa, but in more careful enunciation it may also be pronounced as a full vowel (that of LOT). Compare this with the o in gallon, which is never a full vowel, no matter how carefully one enunciates.

=== Weak and strong forms of function words ===
Some monosyllabic English function words have a weak form with a reduced vowel, used when the word has no prosodic stress, and a phonemically distinct strong form with a full vowel, used when the word is stressed (and as the citation form or isolation form when a word is mentioned standing alone). In the case of many such words, the strong form is also used when the word comes at the end of a sentence or phrase.

An example of such a word is the modal verb can. When appearing unstressed within a sentence and governing a verb (as in I can do it), the weak form /kən/ is used. However the strong form /kæn/ is used:

- when the word is stressed: I don't have to do it, but I can do it
- when the word is phrase-final, i.e. without a governed verb: we won't be doing it, but they can if they want
- when the word is referred to in isolation: The verb "can" is one of the English modals.

In the case of most words with such alternative forms, the weak form is much more common (since it is relatively rare for function words to receive prosodic stress). This is particularly true of the English articles the, a, an, whose strong forms are used within normal sentences only on the rare occasions when definiteness or indefiniteness is being emphasized: Did you find the cat? I found a [eɪ] cat. (i.e. maybe not the one you were referring to). The weak form of the is typically [ði] before a vowel-initial word (the apple) but [ðə] before a consonant-initial word (the pear), although this distinction is being lost in the United States. A similar distinction is sometimes made with to: to Oxford [tu] vs. to Cambridge [tə].

The exact set of words that have weak forms depends on dialect and speaker; the following is a list of the chief words of this type in Received Pronunciation:

Always reduced:

a, an, and, be, been, but, he, her, him, his, just, me, or, she, than, that (as conjunction), the, them, us, we, who, you, your.

Reduced, but stressed at the end of a sentence:

as, at, for, from, of, to, some, there.

Reduced, but stressed at the end of a sentence and when contracted with the negative not:

am, are, can, could, do, does, had, has, have, must, shall, should, was, were, will, would.

In most of the above words the weak form contains schwa, or a syllabic consonant in the case of those ending /l/, /m/ or /n/. However, in be, he, me, she, we, been the vowel may be the reduced form of /ɪ/, or else [i]; and in do, who, you it may be the reduced form of /ʊ/, or [u]. (For the and to, see above.) These various sounds are described in the § Reduced vowels section above.

The weak form of that is used only for the conjunction or relative pronoun (I said that you can; The man that you saw), and not for the demonstrative pronoun or adjective (Put that down; I like that colour).

Another common word with a reduced form is our [ɑɚ]~[ɑː], but this is derived through smoothing rather than vowel reduction.

Other words that have weak forms in many varieties of English include your (weakly pronounced as [jə], or [jɚ] in rhotic accents), and my (pronounced [mɨ] or [mi]). These are sometimes given the eye dialect spellings yer and me.

In highly formal registers with exaggeratedly careful enunciation, weak forms may be avoided. An example is singing, where strong forms may be used almost exclusively, apart (normally) from a, although weak forms may be used more frequently as tempo increases and note-values shorten.

The vowel reduction in weak forms may be accompanied by other sound changes, such as h-dropping, consonant elision, and assimilation. For example, and may reduce to [ən] or just the syllabic consonant [n̩], or [ŋ̍] by assimilation with a following velar, as in lock and key. Compare also definite article reduction.

Synchronically, 'em [əm] functions as a weak form of them, though historically it is derived from a different pronoun, the Old English hem.

The homonymy resulting from the use of some of the weak forms can lead to confusion in writing; the identity of the weak forms of have and of sometimes leads to misspellings such as "would of", "could of", etc. for would have, could have, etc.

English weak forms are clitics: they form a rhythmic pattern with an adjacent word, and cannot occur alone.

== See also ==
- English phonology
- Schwa
- Tenseness
- Vowel reduction
  - Vowel reduction in Russian
- Initial-stress-derived nouns
