= Initial-stress-derived noun =

Phonological process

Initial-stress derivation is a phonological process in English that moves stress to the first syllable of verbs when they are used as nouns or adjectives. (This is an example of a suprafix.) This process can be found in the case of several dozen verb-noun and verb-adjective pairs and is gradually becoming more standardized in some English dialects, but it is not present in all. The list of affected words differs from area to area, and often depends on whether a word is used metaphorically or not. At least 170 verb-noun or verb-adjective pairs exist. Some examples are:

- record.

as a verb, "Remember to recórd the show!".
as a noun, "I'll keep a récord of that request."

- permit.

as a verb, "I won't permít that."
as a noun, "We already have a pérmit."

== Origins ==
Since Early Modern English, polysyllabic nouns in English have had a tendency for the final syllable to be unstressed, but that has not been the case for verbs. Thus, the stress difference between nouns and verbs in English is a general rule and applies not only to otherwise-identical noun-verb pairs. The frequency of such pairs in English is a result of the productivity of conversion of parts of speech.

When "re-" is prefixed to a monosyllabic word, and the word gains currency both as a noun and as a verb, it usually fits into that pattern, but as the following list makes clear, most words fitting the pattern do not match that description.

Many of these have first syllables that evolved from Latin prepositions, but again, that does not account for all of them. See also list of Latin words with English derivatives.

When the stress is moved, the pronunciation of words often changes in other ways as well, especially for vowels, most commonly by the reduction of a vowel sound when it becomes unstressed to a schwa.

== List ==
absent · abstract · accent · addict · address (North America only) · affect · affix · alloy · ally · annex · assay · attribute · augment · belay · bisect · bombard · combat · combine · commune · compact · complex · composite · compost (both initial-stressed in North America) · compound · compress · concert · conduct · confect · confine(s) · conflict · conscript · conserve · consist · console · consort · construct · consult · content · contest · contract · contrast · converse · convert · convict · decrease · default · defect · detail (British Isles only) · dictate · digest · discard · discharge · disconnect · discount · discourse · dismount · envelope · escort · essay · estimate (British Isles only) · excise · exploit · export · extract · ferment · finance · foretaste · fragment · frequent · gallant · impact · implant · impound · import · impress · imprint · incense · incline · increase · indent · inlay · insert · insult · intercept · interchange · intercross · interdict · interlink · interlock · intern · interplay · interspace · interweave · intrigue · invert · invite · involute · mandate (both initial-stressed in North America) · mismatch (both initial-stressed in North America) · misprint (both initial-stressed in North America) · object · offset · overcount · overlap · overlay · overlook · override · overrun · perfect · perfume (often, neither initial-stressed in North America) · permit · pervert · prefix (variable) · present · proceed(s) · process · produce · progress · project · protest (variable) · purport · rebel · recall · recap · recess · recoil · record · recount · redirect · redo · redress · refill · refresh · refund · refuse · regress · rehash · reject · relapse · relay · remake · repeat · repose · repost · reprint · research (variable) · reset · retake · retard · retract · retread · rewrite · segment · subject · survey · suspect · torment (varies) · transform · transplant · transect · transport · transpose · traverse · undercount · upgrade · uplift · upset

== Comments ==
Some two-word phrases follow this pattern. Nouns derived from phrasal verbs like the following are written solid or hyphenated: hand out, drop out, hand over, crack down, follow through, come back.

If the derived noun is widely used (for example "the backup"), its spelling may cause widespread modified spelling of the verb (*to backup instead of to back up). However, the past tense of such verbs is very rarely written as *backedup or *backupped, but almost always as backed up.

In some cases the spelling changes when the accent moves to another syllable, as in the following verb/noun pairs which show the addition of a "magic e", which changes the previous vowel from lax to tense:

- envelop, envelope
- unite, unit

In British English, annexe is the noun from the verb annex. The verb secrete "conceal" probably derives from the noun secret rather than vice versa.

Pronunciations vary geographically. Some words here may belong on this list according to pronunciations prevailing in some regions, but not according to those in others. Some speakers, for example, would consider display as one of these words. For some other speakers, however, address carries stress on the final syllable in both the noun and the verb. There is a category of English dialects in the United States (namely Southern and African-American dialects) referred to informally by linguists as P/U or police/umbrella because many nouns are stressed on the first syllable; including police, umbrella, and other verb-derived nouns. Some dialects of Scottish English have this in "police".

Some derived nouns are used only in restricted senses; often there is a more generic noun not identical in spelling to the verb. For instance, to combine is to put together, whereas a combine may be a farm machine or a railway car; the generic noun is combination. Perhaps transpose is used as a noun only by mathematicians; the transpose of a matrix is the result of the process of transposition of the matrix; the two-syllable noun and the four-syllable noun differ in meaning in that one is the result and the other is the process. Similar remarks apply to transform; the process is transformation, the result of the process is the transform, as in Laplace transform, Fourier transform, etc.

In the case of the word protest, as a noun it has the stress on the first syllable, but as a verb its meaning depends on stress: with the stress on the second syllable it means to raise a protest; on the first it means to participate in a protest. This appears to result from the derived noun being verbed.

Entrance is also a noun when stressed on the first syllable and a verb when on the second, but that is not a true example since the words are unrelated homographs.

== See also ==
- Heteronym (linguistics)
- Suprafix
- List of English homographs
- Stress and vowel reduction in English

== Sources ==
- Jespersen, Otto (24 May 2013) [1954]. "5.7 Distinctive stress". Sounds and Spellings. A Modern English Grammar on Historical Principles. Vol. 1. Routledge. ISBN 9781135663513.
