= Heteronym (linguistics) =

Distinct words with the same spelling

Euler diagram showing the relationships between heteronyms and related linguistic concepts.

A heteronym (also known as a heterophone) is a word that has a different pronunciation and meaning as another word but the same spelling, that is, they are homographs but not homophones. Thus, lead (/lɛd/ the metal) and lead (/liːd/ a leash) are heteronyms, but mean (average) and mean (intend) are not, since they are both pronounced /miːn/. Heteronym pronunciation may vary in vowel realisation, in stress pattern, or in other ways.

== Description ==
A heteronym is a homograph that is not a homophone, a word that has a different pronunciation and meaning from another word with the same spelling. Heteronym pronunciation may vary in vowel realisation, in stress pattern, or in other ways.

"Heterophone" literally just means "different sound", and this term is sometimes applied to words that are just pronounced differently, irrespective of their spelling. Such a definition would include virtually every pair of words in the language, so "heterophone" in this sense is normally restricted to instances where there is some particular reason to highlight the different sound. For example, puns normally involve homophones, but in the case of heterophonic (or imperfect) puns, the two words sound different, and yet similar enough for one to suggest the other (for example, mouth and mouse).

== Types ==
Most heteronyms are doubles. Triple heteronyms are extremely rare in English; one example, sin, is listed below.

Proper nouns can sometimes be heteronyms. For example, the final syllable in the US state of Oregon is pronounced /-ən/ (or /-ɪn/), while in the name of the village of Oregon in Wisconsin, the final syllable is pronounced /-ɒn/. Other examples include local pronunciations of Cairo, Georgia; Versailles, Kentucky; and Milan, Tennessee—compared to the more well-known Cairo, Versailles, and Milan—or the difference between the pronunciation of Louisville, Kentucky (/ˈluːəvəl/) and the town of Louisville, New York (/ˈluːɪsvɪl/).

There are also pairs which ignore case and include both initialisms and regular words, e.g., US and us.

Heteronyms also occur in non-alphabetic languages. For example, 20% of the 2400 most common Chinese characters have multiple readings; e.g., 行 can represent háng 'profession' or xíng 'OK'. In Arabic, vowels are normally not written, leading to ambiguous written words such as <كتب> /ktb/, which can be read /kataba/ 'he wrote', /kutubun/ 'books', or /kutiba/ 'it was written'; it is unclear whether these should be considered heteronyms, since they are unambiguous when fully vocalized.

== Examples ==
=== Heteronyms with definitions ===
==== English ====
In some of these cases, American and British English pronunciations differ. One systematic case appears in the stress pattern of some deverbal nouns. Many of these words have the same origin, and similar meanings, and are essentially the same word. True heteronyms require the two words to be completely unrelated, which is a rare occurrence.

For a longer list, see wikt:Category:English heteronyms.

Examples of heteronyms in English
Spelling	Pronunciation	Part of speech	Meaning
abstract	/ˈæbstrækt/	adjective	existing in thought or as an idea but not having a physical or concrete existence
abstract	/æbˈstrækt/	verb	consider (something) theoretically or separately from something else
abuse	/əˈbjuːs/	noun	improper treatment
abuse	/əˈbjuːz/	verb	to use improperly
address	AmE and BrE /əˈdrɛs/	verb	to direct speech, a letter or a consignment (to)
address	AmE /ˈædrɛs/ BrE and AmE /əˈdrɛs/	noun	a descriptor of location
advocate	/ˈædvəkeɪt/	verb	to argue for someone else
advocate	/ˈædvəkɪt/	noun	a person who speaks in support of something
affect	/əˈfɛkt/	verb	to have an effect on
affect	/ˈæfɛkt/	noun	mood, emotional state
affiliate	/əˈfɪliət/	noun	a company, organization etc. that is connected with or controlled by a larger one
affiliate	/əˈfɪlieɪt/	verb	if a group or organization affiliates to or with another larger one, it forms a close connection with it
agape	/əˈɡeɪp/	adverb	open wide
agape	/ˈæɡəpiː/, /əˈɡɑːpeɪ/	noun	altruistic, beneficial love
allied	/əˈlaɪd/	verb	join for a common purpose (past tense)
allied	/ˈælaɪd/; /æˈlaɪd/	adjective	joined for a common purpose, especially by treaty
alternate	/ˈɔːltərnɪt/ or /ɔːlˈtərnɪt/	adjective	alternating, alternative
alternate	/ˈɔːltərneɪt/	verb	to take turns
alum	/ˈæləm/	noun (or verb)	a type of astringent salt (or to chemically impregnate with that salt)
alum	/əˈlʌm/	noun	a past attendee or graduate (of either gender) of an educational institution
analyses	/əˈnælɪsiːz/	noun	plural of analysis
analyses	/ˈænəlaɪzɪz/	verb	third person singular present of analyse
appropriate	/əˈproʊpriət/	adjective	suitable
appropriate	/əˈproʊprieɪt/	verb	to set apart for
attribute	/ˈætrɪbjuːt/	noun	a characteristic
attribute	/əˈtrɪbjuːt/	verb	to associate ownership
articulate	/ɑːrˈtɪkjʊleɪt/	verb	to speak clearly
articulate	/ɑːrˈtɪkjʊlɪt/	adjective	well-spoken
august/August	/ɔːˈɡʌst, əˈ-/	adjective	awe-inspiring, majestic, noble, venerable
august/August	/ˈɔː.ɡəst/	noun	the eighth month of the Julian and Gregorian calendars
axes	/ˈæksiːz/	noun	pl. of axis
axes	/ˈæksɪz/	noun	pl. of axe
bases	/ˈbeɪsɪz/	noun	plural of base
bases	/ˈbeɪsiːz/	noun	plural of basis
bass	/ˈbeɪs/	noun	low in pitch
bass	/ˈbæs/	noun	a kind of fish
blessed	/ˈblɛsɪd/	adjective	having divine aid
blessed	/ˈblɛst/	verb	past tense of bless
bow	/ˈboʊ/	noun	a stringed weapon, or the initiator of sound in some stringed musical instruments.
bow	/ˈboʊ/	noun	an object that you clip or tie on to your hair to keep it from falling into your face
bow	/ˈbaʊ/	verb	to bend in respect
bow	/ˈbaʊ/	noun	the front of a boat or ship
buffet	/bəˈfeɪ/ or /ˈbʊfeɪ/	noun	sideboard meal
buffet	/ˈbʌfɪt/	verb	to strike
chassis	/ˈ(t)ʃæsi/	noun	the supporting frame of something mechanical
chassis	/ˈ(t)ʃæsiz/	noun	plural form
close	/ˈkloʊz/	verb	to shut
close	/ˈkloʊs/	adjective	nearby
combine	/ˈkɒmbaɪn/	noun	A farm machine that harvests and threshes
combine	/kəmˈbaɪn/	verb	To bring two or more things together, mix
compact	/kəmˈpækt/	verb	to compress
compact	/ˈkɒmpækt/	adjective	small
complex	/ˈkɒmplɛks/	noun	A collection of buildings with a common purpose, such as a university or military base
complex	/kəmˈplɛks/, /ˈkɒmplɛks/	adjective	Made up of multiple parts
compound	/ˈkɒmpaʊnd/	noun	A substance having definite proportions of elements
compound	/kəmˈpaʊnd/	verb	To make a situation worse
concert	/ˈkɒnsərt/	noun	We saw the band in concert.
concert	/kənˈsɜːrt/	verb	We had to concert all our energy to stay awake.
conduct	/ˈkɒndəkt/	noun	action
conduct	/kənˈdʌkt/	verb	to lead
confines	/ˈkɒnfaɪnz/	noun pl.	Work within the confines of the contract.
confines	/kənˈfaɪnz/	verb	But the contract confines my creativity!
conflict	/ˈkɒnflɪkt/	noun	The mother told her angry son, "Violence is no way to resolve conflict!"
conflict	/kənˈflɪkt/	verb	The two news reports seem to conflict with each other.
console	/kənˈsoʊl/	verb	provide comfort from grief
console	/ˈkɒnsoʊl/	noun	control unit
content	/ˈkɒntɛnt/	noun	information
content	/kənˈtɛnt/	adjective, verb	satisfied, satisfy
contract	/ˈkɒntrækt/	noun	The contract was supposed to expire seven years after it was signed.
contract	/kənˈtrækt/	verb	Derek firmly stated that he would rather contract pneumonia and die than stand outside wearing that ridiculous pink and green poncho.
convict	/kənˈvɪkt/	verb	to find guilty
convict	/ˈkɒnvɪkt/	noun	one convicted
coop	/ˈkuːp/	noun	enclosure for chickens
coop	/ˈkoʊ.ɒp/	noun	abbreviation of cooperative (some style guides specify a hyphen for this sense, to increase clarity: co-op.)
coop	/kaʊp/	noun	a cart with closed sides or ends, also spelled cowp.
coordinate	/koʊˈɔːrdənət/	noun	A set of numbers that shows the exact position of a point on a map or graph.
coordinate	/koʊˈɔːrdənət/	adjective	Equal in rank or importance; matching in style or color. The jacket and shoes were coordinate pieces.
coordinate	/koʊˈɔːrdɪneɪt/	verb	To organize people or things so that they work together effectively. The project manager's job is to coordinate between teams.
crooked	/ˈkrʊkt/	verb	I crooked my arm to show the sleeve.
crooked	/ˈkrʊkɪd/	adjective	Unfortunately, that just made the sleeve look crooked.
decrease	/dɪˈkriːs/	verb	To lessen
decrease	/ˈdiːkriːs/	noun	A diminution
defense	/dɪˈfɛns/	noun	The attorney gave a strong defense.
defense	/ˈdiːfɛns/	noun	The coach put out his best defense. (dialectal, used in sports contexts)
desert	/ˈdɛzərt/	noun	an arid region
desert	/dɪˈzɜːrt/	verb	to abandon
discard	/ˈdɪskɑːrd/	noun	Toss it in the discard pile.
discard	/dɪsˈkɑːrd/	verb	But I don't want to discard it!
do	/ˈduː/, /də/	verb	What do you think you are doing?
do	/ˈdoʊ/	noun	To warm-up, the singer sang the scale from do.
does	/ˈdoʊz/	noun	pl. of doe, a female deer.
does	/ˈdʌz/	verb	singular third-person form of do
dogged	/ˈdɒɡd/	verb	At night proctors patrolled the street and dogged your steps if you tried to go into any haunt where the presence of vice was suspected. (Samuel Butler, The Way of All Flesh)
dogged	/ˈdɒɡɪd/	adjective	Still, the dogged obstinacy of his race held him to the pace he had set, and would hold him till he dropped in his tracks. (Jack London, The Son of the Wolf)
dove	/ˈdʌv/	noun	a bird
dove	/ˈdoʊv/	verb	Mainly American past tense of dive
ellipses	/ɪˈlɪpsɪz/	noun	Plural of ellipse
ellipses	/ɪˈlɪpsiːz/	noun	Plural of ellipsis
entrance	/ˈɛntrəns/	noun	way in
entrance	/ɛnˈtræns/, /ɪn-ˈˌ-trɑːns/	verb	to delight
excuse	/ɪkˈskjuːs/, /ɛkˈ-/	noun	explanation designed to avoid or alleviate guilt or negative judgment; a plea offered in extenuation of a fault
excuse	/ɪkˈskjuːz/, /ɛkˈ-/	verb	to forgive; to pardon
exploit	/ˈɛksplɔɪt/	noun	a heroic or extraordinary deed
exploit	/ɛksˈplɔɪt/	verb	to make use of or take advantage of
house	/ˈhaʊs/	noun	a residential building
house	/ˈhaʊz/	verb	to place in residence
incense	/ˈɪnsɛns/	noun	Dad, I bought this incense at the temple.
incense	/ɪnˈsɛns/	verb	Big mistake. If you burn it here, you'll incense your mother.
increase	/ɪnˈkriːs/	verb	To get greater
increase	/ˈɪnkriːs/	noun	An augmentation
intimate	/ˈɪntɪmeɪt/	verb	to suggest
intimate	/ˈɪntɪmət/	adjective	very close
invalid	/ɪnˈvælɪd/	adjective	incorrect
invalid	/ˈɪnvəlɪd/	noun	a disabled person
laminate	/ˈlæmɪneɪt/	verb	to assemble from thin sheets glued together
laminate	/ˈlæmɪnɪt/	noun	material formed of thin sheets glued together
lead	/ˈliːd/	verb	to guide
lead	/ˈlɛd/	noun	a metal
learned	/ˈlɜːrnɪd/	adjective	having much learning
learned	/ˈlɜːrnd/	verb	past tense of learn
lima/Lima	/ˈlaɪmə/	noun or attributive	A type of bean
lima/Lima	/ˈlaɪmə/	proper noun	A city in Ohio, United States
lima/Lima	/ˈliːmə/	proper noun	The capital city of Peru
live	/ˈlɪv/	verb	to be alive
live	/ˈlaɪv/	adjective	having life
merchandise	/ˈmɜːrtʃəndaɪs/	noun	goods available for sale
merchandise	/ˈmɜːrtʃəndaɪz/	verb	to make (something) available for sale
minute	BrE /maɪˈnjuːt/, AmE /maɪˈnuːt/	adjective	small
minute	/ˈmɪnət/	noun	unit of time
moped	/ˈmoʊpɛd/	noun	a small motorcycle
moped	/ˈmoʊpt/	verb	past tense of mope
mow	/ˈmaʊ/	noun	a stack of hay, or the part of a barn where hay is stored
mow	/ˈmoʊ/	verb	To cut something (esp. grass or crops) down; knock down
multiply	/ˈmʌltɪplaɪ/	verb	to increase
multiply	/ˈmʌltɪpli/	adverb	in multiple ways
number	/ˈnʌmbər/	noun	a numeral
number	/ˈnʌmər/	adjective	superlative of numb; more numb
object	/ˈɒbdʒɪkt/	noun	a thing
object	/əbˈdʒɛkt/	verb	to protest
overall	/oʊvərˈɔːl/	adjective	Overall, we didn't do too badly.
overall	/ˈoʊvərɔːl/	noun	I need new overalls to wear.
patronize	AmE /ˈpeɪtɹənaɪz/, BrE /ˈpætɹənaɪz/	verb	to treat with condescension
patronize	/ˈpeɪtɹənaɪz/	verb	to be a patron or customer of
periodic	/ˌpɪəriˈɒdɪk/	adjective	Temperature shows periodic variation.
periodic	/pɜːrˈaɪɒdɪk/	adjective	Periodic acid is an oxoacid of iodine.
present	/prɪˈzɛnt/	verb	to reveal
present	/ˈprɛzənt/	noun	a gift; the current moment
present	/ˈprɛzənt/	adjective	existing in the immediate vicinity (e.g. Santa is present.)
primer	AmE /ˈprɪmər/, BrE /ˈpraɪmər/	noun	book that covers the basic elements of a subject
primer	/ˈpraɪmər/	noun	an undercoat of paint
proceeds	/ˈproʊsiːdz/	noun	revenue
proceeds	/prəˈsiːdz/	verb	Third person singular of the verb "proceed"
produce	BrE /proʊˈdjuːs/, AmE /proʊˈduːs/	verb	to make
produce	BrE /ˈproʊdjuːs/, AmE /ˈproʊduːs/	noun	fruit and vegetables
progress	/prəˈɡrɛs/	verb	I hope things will progress faster.
progress	AmE /ˈprɒɡrɛs/, BrE /ˈproʊɡrɛs/	noun	I haven't made any progress.
project	/ˈprɒdʒɪkt/	noun	an undertaking
project	BrE /proʊˈdʒɛkt/, AmE /prɪˈdʒɛkt/	verb	to cast an image
protest	/ˈproʊtɛst/	noun	an organized event opposing something
protest	/proʊˈtɛst/	verb	to vociferously object
putting	/ˈpʊtɪŋ/	verb	pr. part. of to put
putting	/ˈpʌtɪŋ/	verb	pr. part. of to putt
ragged	/ˈræɡd/	verb	She ragged on me about my ragged jeans.
ragged	/ˈræɡɪd/	adjective	But my ragged jeans are my trademark, I responded.
read	/ˈriːd/	verb	present tense
read	/ˈrɛd/	verb	past tense
rebel	/rɪˈbɛl/	verb	to resist
rebel	/ˈrɛbəl/	noun	one who rebels
record	AmE /ˈrɛkərd/, BrE /ˈrɛkɔːrd/	noun	stored information
record	/rɪˈkɔːrd/	verb	to make a record
recreate	/ˈrɛkrieɪt/	verb	to relax by leisure activity
recreate	/ˌriːkriˈeɪt/	verb	to give new life or create again (some style guides specify a hyphen for this sense, to increase clarity: re-create)
refund	/ˈriːfʌnd/	noun	an amount of money that is given back to you if you are not satisfied with the goods or services that you have paid for
refund	/rɪˈfʌnd/	verb	to give someone their money back
refuse	/ˈrɛfjuːs/	noun	garbage
refuse	/rɪˈfjuːz/	verb	to decline
reject	/ˈriːdʒɛkt/	noun	a product that has been rejected because there is something wrong with it
reject	/rɪˈdʒɛkt/	verb	to refuse to accept, believe in, or agree with something
resign	/rɪˈzaɪn/	verb	1. to quit 2. to accept that something undesirable cannot be avoided
resign	/riːˈsaɪn/	verb	to sign again; re-sign
resume	BrE /rɪˈzjuːm/, AmE /rɪˈzuːm/	verb	to start again
resume	BrE /ˈrɛzjʊmeɪ/, AmE /ˈrɛzʊmeɪ/	noun	curriculum vitae (sometimes distinguished with acute accents; résumé)
retreat	/rɪˈtriːt/	verb	to fall back from a battle front
retreat	/riːˈtriːt/	verb	to treat again (some style guides specify a hyphen for this sense, to increase clarity: re-treat)
root	/ˈruːt/ or /ˈrʊt/	noun	The tree's root was rotted.
root	/ˈruːt/	verb	A pig can be trained to root for mushrooms.
row	/ˈroʊ/	noun, verb	a line; to paddle a boat
row	/ˈraʊ/	noun	an argument
sake	/ˈseɪk/	noun	benefit
sake	/ˈsɑːki/, /ˈsɑːkeɪ/	noun	Japanese rice wine
second	/ˈsɛkənd/	adjective, noun, verb	1. ordinal of "two", 2. 1/60 of a minute, 3. to endorse a motion raised during a meeting
second	/səˈkɒnd/	verb	to transfer temporarily to an alternative employment
separate	/ˈsɛp(ə)rət/	adjective	This should be divided into packets of ten cartridges each, which should be rolled up in flannel and hermetically sealed in separate tin canisters. (Samuel W. Baker, The Nile Tributaries of Abyssinia)
separate	/ˈsɛpəreɪt/	verb	To stalk these wary antelopes I was obliged to separate from my party, who continued on their direct route. (Samuel W. Baker, The Nile Tributaries of Abyssinia)
sewer	BrE /ˈsjuːər/, AmE /ˈsuːər/	noun	drainage pipes
sewer	/ˈsoʊ.wər/	noun	one who sews
shower	/ˈʃaʊ.wər/	noun	precipitation
shower	/ˈʃoʊ.wər/	noun	one who shows
sin/Sin	/ˈsɪn/	noun	a moral error
sin/Sin	/ˈsaɪn/	noun	abbrev. for sine
sin/Sin	/ˈsiːn/	noun	Sumerian god of the moon; Arabic letter
slough	/ˈslʌf/	verb	to shed
slough	/ˈsluː/	noun	a small waterway
slough	/ˈslaʊ/	proper noun	a town in Berkshire
sow	/ˈsoʊ/	verb	to plant seeds
sow	/ˈsaʊ/	noun	a mature female swine
subject	/ˈsʌbdʒɪkt/	noun	a topic
subject	/səbˈdʒɛkt/	verb	to cause to undergo
supposed	/səˈpoʊz(ɪ)d/	adjective	being assumed to be
supposed	/səˈpoʊst/	verb	obliged to do
supposed	/səˈpoʊzd/	verb	past sense of suppose
tarry	/ˈtæri/	verb	to linger
tarry	/ˈtɑːri/	adjective	similar to tar
tear	/ˈtɪər/	noun	liquid produced by crying
tear	/ˈtɛər/	verb, noun	to separate
tier	/ˈtɪər/	noun	level or rank
tier	/ˈtaɪ.ər/	noun	one who ties
transfer	/ˈtrænsfər/	noun	a movement of something from one place to another
transfer	/trænsˈfɜːr/	verb	to move something from one place to another (the verb can be accented on either syllable)
use	/ˈjuːs/	noun	The car was of little use to us.
use	/ˈjuːz/	verb	Betsy wanted to use the battery inside.
unionized	/ˈjuːnjənaɪzd/	verb	formed into a union; past tense of unionize.
unionized	/ʌnˈaɪənaɪzd/	adjective	not ionized (some style guides specify a hyphen for this sense, to increase clarity: un-ionized)
whoop	/ˈhwʊp/	verb	Pa says he's gonna whoop you good if you don't learn some manners!
whoop	/ˈhwuːp/	verb	When they scored a goal, he began to whoop and holler.
wicked	/ˈwɪkɪd/	adjective	bad, evil
wicked	/ˈwɪkt/	verb	past tense of wick (e.g. to wick away some liquid)
wind	/ˈwɪnd/	noun	air movement
wind	/ˈwaɪnd/	verb	to tighten a mechanical spring
wound	/ˈwaʊnd/	verb	past tense of wind (e.g. tightened a mechanical spring)
wound	/ˈwuːnd/	noun, verb	an injury

==== French ====
In French, most heteronyms result from certain endings being pronounced differently in verbs and nouns. In particular, -ent as a third person plural verb ending is silent while as an adjective ending, it is pronounced IPA: [ɑ̃].

Examples of heteronyms in French
Spelling	Pronunciation	Part of speech	Meaning
affluent	[afly]	verb	they pour in
affluent	[aflɥɑ̃]	noun	a tributary of a river
as	[ɑ]	verb	you have
as	[ɑs]	noun	an ace
bout	[bu]	noun	end
bout	[but]	noun	rope (in nautical usage)
content	[kɔ̃t]	verb	they recount
content	[kɔ̃tɑ̃]	adjective	happy
convient	[kɔ̃vi]	verb	they invite
convient	[kɔ̃vjɛ̃]	verb	it is suitable
couvent	[kuv]	verb	they brood (eggs)
couvent	[kuvɑ̃]	noun	a convent
éditions	[editjɔ̃]	verb	we edited
éditions	[edisjɔ̃]	noun	publications
est	[ɛ]	verb	he/she is
est	[ɛst]	noun	the East
excellent	[ɛksɛl]	verb	they excel
excellent	[ɛksɛlɑ̃]	adjective	excellent
expédient	[ɛkspedi]	verb	they send
expédient	[ɛkspedjɑ̃]	noun	an expedient
fier	[fje]	verb	to trust
fier	[fjɛʁ]	adjective	proud
fils	[fis]	noun	son, sons
fils	[fil]	noun	wires
négligent	[neɡliʒ]	verb	they neglect
négligent	[neɡliʒɑ̃]	adjective	negligent
objections	[ɔbʒektjɔ̃]	verb	we objected
objections	[ɔbʒeksjɔ̃]	noun	objections
oignons	[waɲɔ̃]	verb	we anoint
oignons	[ɔɲɔ̃]	noun	onions (Note: The official spelling since 1990 is ognon, but oignon is still more widely-used.)
parent	[paʁ]	verb	they adorn
parent	[paʁɑ̃]	noun	parent
plus	[plys]	adverb	more
plus	[ply]	adverb	no more
portions	[pɔʁtjɔ̃]	verb	we carried
portions	[pɔʁsjɔ̃]	noun	portions
relations	[ʁəlatjɔ̃]	verb	we recounted
relations	[ʁəlɑsjɔ̃]	noun	relations
résident	[ʁezid]	verb	they reside
résident	[ʁezidɑ̃]	noun	resident
violent	[vjɔl]	verb	they violate
violent	[vjɔlɑ̃]	adjective	violent
vis	[vi]	verb	I live, I saw (past)
vis	[vis]	noun	screw, screws

==== Modern Greek ====
Modern Greek spelling is largely unambiguous, but there are a few cases where a word has distinct learned and vernacular meaning and pronunciation, despite having the same root, and where <ia> is pronounced /ja/ vs. /i.a/; Some of these distinctions are being neutralized in modern speech.

Examples of heteronyms in Greek
Spelling	Pronunciation	Part of speech	Meaning
άδεια	[ˈaðʝa]	adjective	empty
άδεια	[ˈaði.a]	noun	leave, day off
βεντέτα	[venˈdeta]	noun	vendetta
βεντέτα	[veˈdeta]	noun	star (artist)
βιάζω	[ˈvʝazo]	verb	I hasten
βιάζω	[viˈazo]	verb	I rape
καμπάνα	[kamˈbana]	noun	bell
καμπάνα	[kaˈbana]	noun	cabana
λόγια	[ˈloʝa]	noun	words
λόγια	[ˈloʝi.a]	adjective	learnèd

==== Italian ====
Italian spelling is largely unambiguous, althouɡh there are some exceptions:

- open and closed ⟨e⟩ and ⟨o⟩ (/ɛ, e/ and /ɔ, o/) are not distinguished;
- the voiced and unvoiced pronunciations of ⟨s⟩ and ⟨z⟩ (/s, z/ and /ts, dz/) are not distinguished;
- stress, which is usually but not always on the penult, is not marked except when it is on the final syllable;
- in some cases, digraphs and trigraphs like ⟨sci⟩ (/ʃ(i)/), ⟨ci⟩ (/tʃ(i)/), ⟨gi⟩ (/dʒ(i)/), ⟨gli⟩ (/ʎ(i)/) are pronounced using the values of their component letters;
- ⟨i⟩ and ⟨u⟩ may have a vocalic (/i, u/) or a consonantal (/j, w/) value.

When stress is on the final, the vowel is written with an accent: mori 'mulberries' and morì 'he/she died'. Some monosyllabic words are also differentiated with an accent: e /e/ 'and' and è /ɛ/ 'he/she is'. These cases are not heteronyms.

Some common cases:

Vowel quality difference
Spelling	Pronunciation	Part of speech	Meaning
affetto	affètto	noun	affection
affetto	affétto	verb	I slice
arena	arèna	noun	arena
arena	aréna	noun	sand
botte	bòtte	noun	blows, pounding
botte	bótte	noun	barrel
collega	collèga	noun	colleague
collega	colléga	verb	he/she connects
colto	còlto	ppl.	gathered
colto	cólto	adjective	cultivated
corresse	corrèsse	verb	he/she corrected (correggere)
corresse	corrésse	verb	he/she ran (subj.) (correre)
corso	còrso	noun	a Corsican
corso	córso	noun	a course
corso	córso	ppl.	run
credo	crèdo	noun	creed
credo	crédo	verb	I believe
esca	èsca	verb	he/she exits
esca	ésca	noun	bait
esse	èsse	noun	the letter S
esse	ésse	pron.	they (f.)
foro	fòro	noun	forum, court
foro	fóro	noun	a hole
fosse	fòsse	noun	pits
fosse	fósse	verb	were (imperfect subj.)
indotto	indòtto	adjective	ignorant
indotto	indótto	ppl.	induced
legge	lègge	verb	he/she reads
legge	légge	noun	law
mento	mènto	verb	I lie
mento	ménto	noun	chin
meta	mèta	noun	destination, aim, score
meta	méta	noun	haystack, dung
messe	mèsse	noun	harvest
messe	mésse	noun	religious mass
pesca	pèsca	noun	peach
pesca	pésca	noun	fishing
pesca	pésca	verb	he/she fishes
peste	pèste	noun	plague
peste	péste	adjective	crushed (f.pl.)
peste	péste	noun	footprints
re	rè	noun	re (music)
re	ré	noun	king
scopo	scòpo	noun	goal
scopo	scópo	verb	I sweep
sorta	sòrta	noun	kind
sorta	sórta	verb	I rose
tema	tèma	noun	theme, subject
tema	téma	noun	fear
torta	tòrta	adjective, ppl.	twisted (f. sing.)
torta	tórta	noun	a torte
venti	vènti	noun	winds
venti	vénti	noun	twenty
volgo	vòlgo	verb	I turn
volgo	vólgo	noun	the people
volto	vòlto	ppl.	turned
volto	vólto	noun	face

Stress difference
Spelling	Pronunciation	Part of speech	Meaning
ancora	àncora	noun	anchor
ancora	ancòra	adverb	again
ambito	àmbito	noun	ambit, scope
ambito	ambìto	ppl.	longed-for
compito	cómpito	noun	task
compito	compìto	ppl.	polite, completed
cupido	cùpido	adjective	covetous
cupido	cupìdo	noun	Cupid
nocciolo	nòcciolo	noun	kernel
nocciolo	nocciòlo	noun	hazelnut tree
principi	prìncipi	noun	princes
principi	princìpi	noun	principles
retina	rètina	noun	retina
retina	retìna	noun	small net
seguito	sèguito	noun	sequel
seguito	seguìto	ppl.	followed
Sofia	Sòfia	noun	Sofia (Bulgaria)
Sofia	Sofìa	noun	Sofia (name)
subito	sùbito	adverb	immediately
subito	subìto	ppl.	undergone

Voicing difference
Spelling	Pronunciation	Part of speech	Meaning
razza	[ˈrattsa]	noun	race, breed
razza	[ˈraddza]	noun	ray, skate (fish)

==== Dutch ====
Dutch has heteronyms which vary in stress position, known as klemtoonhomogramen 'stress homograms', such as appel: [ˈɑpəl] 'apple' vs. [ɑˈpɛl] 'appeal' (formerly written appèl). Other examples include beamen, bedelen, hockeyster, kantelen, misdadiger, overweg, verspringen, verwerpen.

The word plant is generally pronounced [plɑnt], but may be pronounced [plɛnt] in the sense 'he/she plans'.

==== German ====
German has few heteronyms, for example:

- Some vary in stress position: umfahren 'to knock down' vs. umfahren 'to bypass'; übersetzen 'to translate' vs. übersetzen 'to traverse'; Spiegelei 'fried egg' vs. Spiegelei 'mirroring'.
- Some are compounded differently: Staubecken as Stau-becken vs. Staub-Ecken or Wachstube as 'Wach-stube' vs. 'Wachs-tube'; etc.
- Several are borrowings: modern 'to molder' (derived from Moder) vs. modern 'modern' (borrowed from French) or Montage 'Mondays' vs. Montaĝe 'mounting, installing, assembling' (the latter borrowed from French).

== See also ==
- Homograph
- Homonym
- Synonym
- Shibboleth
