= Bleeck =

Bleeck or van Bleeck is a surname, and may refer to:

- Arthur Henry Bleeck (1829–1877), British orientalist
- Oliver Bleeck, pseudonym of Ross Thomas (author)
- Peter van Bleeck (baptized 1697 – 1764), Dutch portrait painter and engraver
- Richard van Bleeck (1670–1733), Dutch painter
