= Yadollah Samareh =

Iranian linguist (1932–2019)

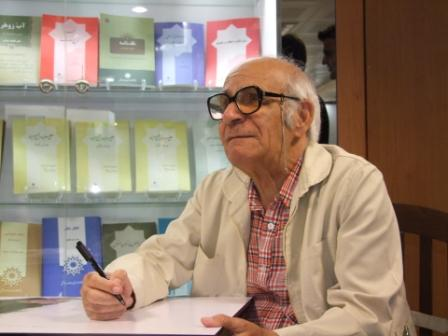
- Born: 1932
- Died: 22 February 2019 (aged 86–87)
- Education: University College London (PhD)
- Scientific career
- Fields: Phonetics
- Institutions: University of Tehran
- Thesis: The Phonological Structure of Syllable and Word in Tehrani Persian (1968)
- Doctoral advisor: Joseph Desmond O'Connor
- Other academic advisors: A. C. Gimson, Gordon Frederick Arnold, Michael Halliday, Dennis Fry
- Doctoral students: Mahmood Bijankhan; Omid Tabibzadeh

Yadollah Samareh (1932 – 22 February 2019) was an Iranian linguist and emeritus professor of linguistics at the University of Tehran. He was known for his expertise on Persian phonetics. Samareh was a permanent member of the Academy of Persian Language and Literature. He was the first Iranian PhD graduate of University College London. A festschrift in his honor, edited by Omid Tabibzadeh, was published in 2004.

== Books ==
- Persian Phonetics, Tehran: Iran University Press
- Teaching Persian, Tehran: MSRT
- Persian language teaching. Elementary course
- Enseignement de la langue persane
- Persische Sprachlehre
