= James Hurford =

British linguist

- Born: 16 July 1941 (age 83)
- Education: University College London (PhD)
- Scientific career
- Fields: linguistics
- Institutions: University of Edinburgh
- Thesis: The speech of one family : a phonetic comparison of the speech of three generations in a family of East Londoners (1965)
- Doctoral advisor: J. D O'Connor
- Other academic advisors: Dennis Fry, A. C. Gimson, Michael Halliday, Gordon Frederick Arnold, Robert M. W. Dixon, John C. Wells, Olive M. Tooley
- Doctoral students: Philip Carr, Simon M. Kirby

James Raymond Hurford, FBA (born 16 July 1941) is a retired linguist and academic.

He was the General Editor of the book series Oxford Studies in the Evolution of Language, as well as a member of the Centre for Language Evolution (formerly Language Evolution and Computation) research group at the University of Edinburgh where he is an emeritus professor.

He also helped organize the series of International Conferences on the Evolution of Language, of which he was one of the founders.

Hurford was elected a Fellow of the British Academy in 2015.

== Publications ==
- 2014 The Origins of Language: A Slim Guide
- 2011 The Origins of Grammar: Language in the Light of Evolution
- 2007 The Origins of Meaning: Language in the Light of Evolution
- 1994 Grammar: a Student's Guide
- 1987 Language and Number: the emergence of a cognitive system
- 1983 Semantics: a Coursebook
- 1975 The Linguistic Theory of Numerals

As Editor:

- 2000 The Evolutionary Emergence of Language: Social function and the origins of linguistic form, edited by Chris Knight, Michael Studdert-Kennedy and James R Hurford
- 1998 Approaches to the Evolution of Language: social and cognitive bases, edited by James R Hurford, Michael Studdert-Kennedy and Chris Knight.
