= Van Royen =

Van Royen or Van Roijen is a Dutch toponymic surname. "Rooij" or "Roij" was a local term for many towns ending with "rode" or "roij", like Nistelrode, Sint-Oedenrode, Stramproy and Wanroij. This suffix itself means "a clearing made by men". Notable people with the surname include:

- Adriaan van Royen (1704–1779), Dutch physician and botanist
- Heleen van Royen (born 1965), Dutch novelist and columnist
- Herman van Roijen (1905–1991), Dutch diplomat and politician, Minister of Foreign Affairs in 1946
- Marjon van Royen (born 1957), Dutch journalist and foreign news correspondent
- Willem Hendrik Wilhelmus van Royen (1672–1742), Dutch game still life and animal genre painter
- Willem Frederiksz van Royen (c.1645–1723), Dutch still life and flower painter

Snel van Royen

- Rudolph Snel van Royen (1546–1613), Dutch linguist and mathematician
- Willebrord Snel van Royen (1580–1626), Dutch astronomer and mathematician, son of Rudolph

== See also ==
- Van Rooyen and Van Rooij, surnames of the same origin
