= Neil Smith (linguist) =

British linguist (1939–2023)

- Born: 1939
- Died: 16 November 2023 (aged 83–84)
- Spouse: Saras Smith (1936–2018)
- Children: 2, including Ivan Smith

Academic background
- Doctoral advisor: Dennis Fry
- Other advisor: Gordon Frederick Arnold

Academic work
- Discipline: Linguistics
- Sub-discipline: Applied linguistics
- Institutions: University College London
- Doctoral students: Ianthi-Maria Tsimpli, Geoffrey K. Pullum

Neilson Voyne Smith FBA (1939 – 16 November 2023), known as Neil Smith, was Emeritus Professor of Linguistics at University College London.

He wrote his PhD (1964) on the grammar of Nupe, a language of Nigeria. Since then his research has encompassed theoretical syntax, language acquisition, the savant syndrome, and general linguistic theory, particularly the work of Noam Chomsky.

In the 1990s he began working with an autistic man, Christopher, in collaboration with Ianthi-Maria Tsimpli. According to Smith and Tsimpli, Christopher has a non-verbal IQ of between 60 and 70, but his English is comparable to that of normal native speakers, and he has an extraordinary ability to learn new languages.

Smith was Head of the Department of Phonetics and Linguistics at University College London from 1983 to 1990, and headed the Linguistics section from 1972 until his retirement in 2006, when he was presented with a Festschrift Language in Mind: A Tribute to Neil Smith on the Occasion of his Retirement (edited by Robyn Carston, Diane Blakemore and Hans van de Koot).

== Honours ==
Smith was elected a Fellow of the British Academy (FBA) in 1999. He was made an Honorary Member of the Linguistic Society of America in 2000.

== Personal life and death ==
Smith was married to Saras Smith (née Saraswati Keskar, 1936–2018). Together they endowed the Neil and Saras Smith Medal for Linguistics.

Smith died on 16 November 2023, at the age of 83–84.

== Selected works ==
- An Outline Grammar of Nupe (School of Oriental and African Studies Press, 1967)
- The Acquisition of Phonology (Cambridge University Press, 1973)
- Modern Linguistics: The Results of Chomsky's Revolution (with Deirdre Wilson; Penguin, 1979)
- The Twitter Machine: Reflections on Language (Blackwell, 1989)
- The Mind of a Savant (with Ianthi-Maria Tsimpli; Blackwell, 1995)
- Chomsky: Ideas and Ideals (Cambridge University Press, 1999; second edition 2004; third edition, with Nicholas Allott, 2016)
- Language, Bananas and Bonobos: Linguistic Problems, Puzzles and Polemics (Blackwell, 2002)
- Language, Frogs and Savants: More Linguistic Problems, Puzzles and Polemics (Blackwell, 2005)
- Acquiring Phonology: A Cross-generational Case-study (Cambridge University Press, 2010)
- The Signs of a Savant (with Gary Morgan, Ianthi-Maria Tsimpli and Bencie Woll) (Cambridge University Press, 2011)
