= Ali Ashraf Sadeghi =

Iranian linguist

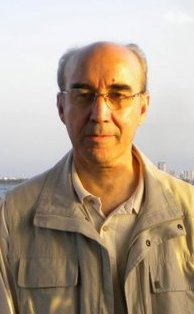
- Born: 15 May 1941 (age 85); Qom, Iran
- Education: University of Paris (PhD)
- Scientific career
- Fields: Persian grammar
- Institutions: University of Tehran

Ali-Ashraf Sadeghi (Persian: علی‌اشرف صادقی; born 15 May 1941) is an Iranian linguist and emeritus professor of linguistics at the University of Tehran. He is known for his expertise on Persian grammar. Sadeghi is a permanent member of the Academy of Persian Language and Literature. A festschrift in his honor, edited by Omid Tabibzadeh, was published in 2003.

== Books ==
- Persian Grammar
- Formation of the Persian Language
