= Van Rooy =

Van Rooy or Van Rooij is a Dutch toponymic surname. "Rooij" was a local term for many towns ending with "rode" or "roij", like Nistelrode, Sint-Oedenrode, Stramproy and Wanroij. This suffix means "a clearing made by men".

Colonialisation caused an expansion of Europe into the rest of the world. South Africa saw many European/Dutch Settlers from the late 16 century to the 18th century. Along with the complex socio-geodemographic development that occurred in South Africa at the time, the van Rooy family name expanded in 2 directions within the racial context of the time. Attached (and to come) is the family tree of Pieter & Johanna van Rooy (maiden surname: Koordom) whom originated from Piketberg (RSA) and moved (circa 1920) to Cape Town (RSA). They reared 8 children from whom the family has evolved into its current 5th generation.

Notable people with this surname include:

- Anton van Rooy (1870–1932), Dutch bass-baritone opera singer
- Bart van Rooij (born 2001), Dutch footballer
- Charles van Rooy (1912–1996), Dutch politician
- Elsbeth van Rooy-Vink (born 1973), Dutch mountain biker
- Frans van Rooij (born 1963), Dutch footballer
- Kenneth Van Rooy (born 1993), Belgian racing cyclist
- Sam van Rooy (born1985), Belgian politician for Vlaams Belang, author, blogger, and former professional cyclist
- Yvonne van Rooy (born 1951), Dutch politician, daughter of Charles

== See also ==
- Van Rooy sheep, a breed of sheep named after the original breeder, South African Senator J. C. van Rooy
- Van Rooi, variant spelling
- Van Rooyen and Van Royen, Dutch surnames of the same origin
