= Bencie Woll =

British sign language specialist

Professor Bencie Woll MBE FBA FAAAS
- Born: 1950 (age 75–76); New York City, US

Academic background
- Education: University of Pennsylvania; University of Essex; University of Bristol

Academic work
- Discipline: Linguistics and sign language
- Sub-discipline: Linguistics of sign language; Sociolinguistics; British Sign Language; Sociolinguistics of Deaf communities; Cognitive linguistics and sign language; Children and sign language
- Institutions: University of Bristol; City University, London; University College London

Bencie Woll MBE FBA FAAAS (born 1950) is an American–British linguist and scholar of sign language. She became the first professor of sign language in the United Kingdom when she was appointed Professor of Sign Language and Deaf Studies at City University, London in 1995. In 2005, she moved to University College London where she became Professor of Sign Language and Deaf Studies and Director of the Deafness, Cognition and Language Research Centre (DCAL).

== Early life and education ==
Woll was born in 1950 in New York City, United States. She is a graduate of the Bronx High School of Science in 1966. She studied at the University of Pennsylvania, where she majored in linguistics and graduated with a Bachelor of Arts (BA) degree in 1970. She then moved to the United Kingdom where she studied theoretical linguistics at the University of Essex, graduating with a Master of Arts (MA) degree in 1971. During her time teaching at the University of Bristol, she studied for a Doctor of Philosophy (PhD) degree in sign language linguistics. She was awarded her doctorate in 1992.

== Academic career ==
Woll's academic research is focused on the linguistics of sign language. She has researched the history and sociolinguistics of British Sign Language (BSL), sociolinguistics of Deaf communities, language development in deaf children, the neuroscience of sign language and developmental and acquired sign language impairments.

From 1973 to 1995, Woll worked at the University of Bristol as a research associate, research fellow, lecturer, and then senior lecturer. In 1995, she was appointed to City University, London, as Professor of Sign Language and Deaf Studies. She thereby became the first person in the United Kingdom to hold a chair in sign language. In August 2005, she moved to University College London (UCL) where she was appointed Professor of Sign Language and Deaf Studies. In 2006, she founded the Deafness Cognition and Language Research Centre at UCL: she served as its director from 2006 to 2016.

Woll offers her services as an expert witness in court cases involving deaf people and British Sign Language. She served as Vice Chair of the Royal Association for Deaf People between 2002 and 2008. Since 2011, she has been a trustee of the UK Council on Deafness.

== Honours ==
Woll was awarded the 2000 BAAL Book Prize for The Linguistics of British Sign Language: An Introduction. In 2012, she was elected a Fellow of the British Academy (FBA), the United Kingdom's national academy for the humanities and social sciences. In 2016, she was elected a Fellow of the American Association for the Advancement of Science.

She was appointed Member of the Order of the British Empire (MBE) in the 2023 Birthday Honours for services to higher education and deaf people.

== Selected works ==
- Kyle, Jim G.; Woll, Bencie (1988). Sign language: the study of deaf people and their language. Cambridge: Cambridge University Press. ISBN 978-0521357173.
- Sutton-Spence, Rachel; Woll, Bencie (1998). The linguistics of British Sign Language: an introduction. New York: Cambridge University Press. ISBN 978-0521631426.
- Baker, Anne; Woll, Bencie, eds. (2008). Sign language acquisition. Amsterdam: John Benjamins Publishing. ISBN 978-9027222442.
- Pfau, Roland; Steinbach, Markus; Woll, Bencie, eds. (2012). Sign language: an international handbook. Berlin: De Gruyter Mouton. ISBN 978-3110204216.
- Smith, Neil; Tsimpli, Ianthi; Morgan, Gary; Woll, Bencie (2014). The Signs of a Savant: Language Against the Odds. Cambridge: Cambridge University Press. ISBN 978-0511780530.
- Orfanidou, Eleni; Woll, Bencie; Morgan, Gary, eds. (2015). Research Methods in Sign Language Studies: A Practical Guide. Oxford: Wiley Blackwell. ISBN 978-1118271414.
