= Dushyant =

Dushyant or Dushyanth is an Indian male given name. Notable people with the name include:

- Dushyanta, legendary king of the Chandravamsha (Lunar) dynasty in Hindu literature
- Dushyant Chaturvedi, Indian politician
- Dushyant Chauhan (born 1993), Indian rower and army officer
- Dushyant Chautala (born 1988), Indian politician
- Dushyant Kumar Gautam (born 1957), Indian politician
- Dushyant Kumar (1931–1975), Indian poet
- Dushyant Mahendrabhai Patel (born 1958), Indian-American businessman
- Dushyanth Ramkumar (born 1983), Indian actor and producer
- Dushyant Singh (born 1973), Indian politician and businessman
- Dushyant Pratap Singh (born 1977), Indian film director and screenwriter
- Dushyanth Sridhar, Indian film director, writer, and public speaker
- Dushyant Wagh (born 1987), Indian actor
- Dushyanth Weeraman (born 1980), Sri Lankan singer, dancer, and actor
