= Looking at Nima Yoshij's Poetry =

Iranian non-fiction book

A look at Nima Yoshij's poetry: A discussion on how poetic systems originated
- Author: Omid Tabibzadeh
- Genre: nonfiction
- Publisher: Niloofar Publications
- Publication date: 2010
- Publication place: Iran
- ISBN: 9789644484063

A look at Nima Yoshij's poetry: A discussion on how poetic systems originated is a book by Omid Tabibzadeh that deals with the place of Nima Yooshij in contemporary Iranian literature and the formation of new poetic systems.
