= Van Rooyen =

Van Rooyen or Van Rooijen (Dutch pronunciation: [vɑn ˈroːi.ə(n)]) is an Afrikaans and Dutch toponymic surname. "Rooij" or "Roij" was a local term for many towns ending with "rode" or "roij", like Nistelrode, Sint-Oedenrode, Stramproy and Wanroij. This suffix itself means "a clearing made by men". Notable people with the surname include:

- Ack van Rooyen (1930–2021), Dutch jazz trumpeter, brother of Jerry
- Aimee van Rooyen (born 1995), South African rhythmic gymnast
- Basil van Rooyen (born 1939), South African racing driver
- Cornelius van Rooyen (1860–1915), South African-born Rhodesian big game hunter and dog breeder
  - Van Rooyen's Lion Dog (a.k.a. Rhodesian Ridgeback), bred by him
- David van Rooyen (born 1968), South African politician, Government Minister 2015–18
- Diederik van Rooijen (born 1975), Dutch television and movie director
- Erik van Rooyen (born 1990), South African golfer
- Gert van Rooyen (1938–1990), South African serial killer
- Jacques van Rooyen (born 1986), South African rugby player
- Jerry van Rooyen, born "Gerard van Rooijen" (1928–2009), Dutch trumpeter, conductor, and composer
- Laurens van Rooyen (born 1935), Dutch pianist and composer
- Manon van Rooijen (born 1982), Dutch swimmer
- Martin van Rooijen (born 1942), Dutch politician, State Secretary of Finances 1973–77
- Maurits van Rooijen (born 1956), Dutch social and economic historian
- Michael VanRooyen (born 1961), American humanitarian and physician
- Mitchell van Rooijen (born 1998), Dutch football forward
- Myriam van Rooyen-Steenman (born 1950), Dutch rower
- Olivia van Rooijen (born 1988), Dutch rower
- Reynier van Rooyen (born 1990), South African rugby player
- Rocco van Rooyen (born 1992), South African javelin thrower
- Rudi van Rooyen (born 1992), South African rugby player
- Shaun van Rooyen (born 1987), New Zealand soccer player
- Stephen Mark van Rooyen (born 1962), South African medical fraudster; a US most wanted fugitive
- Tank van Rooyen (1892–1942), South African rugby player
- Wilco van Rooijen (born 1967), Dutch mountaineer who survived the 2008 K2 disaster

== See also ==
- Van Rooij and Van Royen, Dutch surnames of the same origin
