= Ianthi-Maria Tsimpli =

British linguist (born 1964)

- Born: 2 February 1964 (age 62)

Academic background
- Education: University College London (PhD)
- Thesis: Functional Categories and Maturation: The Prefunctional Stage of Language Acquisition (1992)
- Doctoral advisor: Neil Smith

Academic work
- Discipline: linguistics
- Sub-discipline: applied linguistics
- Institutions: Cambridge University

Ianthi-Maria Tsimpli (born 2 February 1964) is a Greek linguist and Chair of English and Applied Linguistics at the University of Cambridge. She is an associate editor of the journal Glossa and was elected a fellow of the British Academy in 2021.

== Books ==
- The Mind of a Savant: Language Learning and Modularity (1995, Blackwell)
