= Daniël Haringh =

Dutch painter

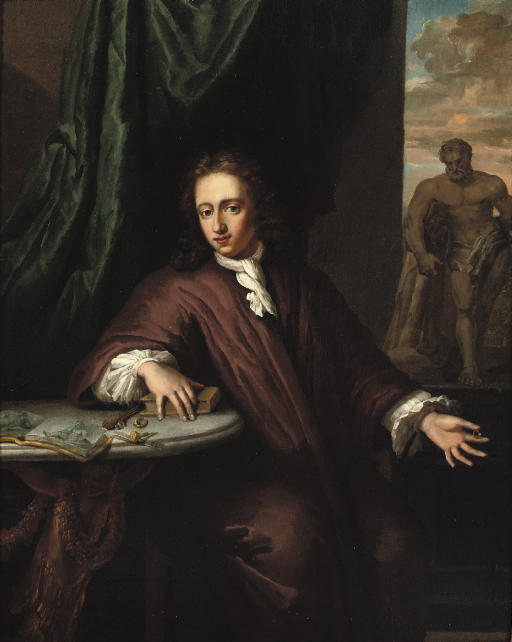
Portrait of a goldsmith with the Hercules Farnese

Daniël Haringh (1636–1713) was an 18th-century painter from the Dutch Republic.

== Biography ==
He was born and died in Loosduinen. According to the RKD he was a pupil during the years 1664–1669 of Arnold van Ravesteyn and Caspar Netscher, and in 1669 he became a member of the Confrerie Pictura. He is known for portraits and interior decorations. His pupils were Richard van Bleeck, Michiel Godijn, Abraham van Hoogstraten, and Dirk Kindt, or Kint.
