= Nicolaas Piemont =

Dutch Golden Age landscape painter

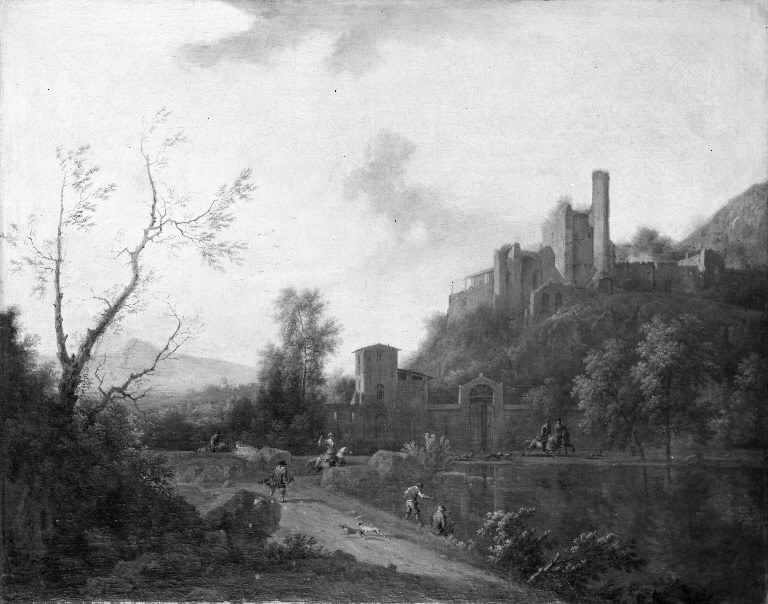
Mountain Scenery with a Castle

Nicolaes Piemont (1644–1709) was a Dutch Golden Age landscape painter who travelled to Rome in the 1670s.

== Biography ==
Nicolaas Piemont was born in Amsterdam. According to Houbraken, Piemont was a member of the Bentvueghels with the nickname "Opgang" who signed Abraham Genoels's bentbrief in Rome in 1674.

According to the RKD he was nicknamed "Opgang" and was known for Italianate landscapes. This painter made some paintings in the dollhouse of Petronella Oortman (in the collection of the Rijksmuseum today), together with the painters Willem Frederiksz van Royen and Johannes Voorhout. Piemont's contributions were Italianate landscapes on the walls of the parlour in the dollhouse, one side of which was interrupted by a miniature hearth, of which the intricate decorative mantelpiece was painted on in a different (unspecified) hand. Piemont died in Vollenhove.
