= Omid Tabibzadeh =

20th and 21st-century Iranian linguist and essayist

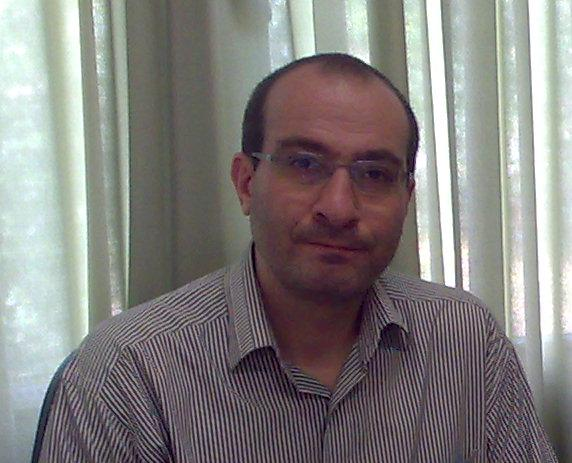
- Born: 1961 (age 64–65); Tehran, Iran
- Awards: Farabi International Award

Academic background
- Education: University of Tehran
- Thesis: Metrics of the Persian Folk Poetry (2000)
- Doctoral advisor: Yadollah Samareh
- Influences: Abolhassan Najafi, Parviz Natel Khanlari, Ali Ashraf Sadeghi

Academic work
- Institutions: Institute for Humanities and Cultural Studies, Bu-Ali Sina University
- Main interests: Phonology, Phonetics, Persian grammar, Persian metres

Omid Tabibzadeh Ghamsari (Persian: امید طبیب‌زاده قمصری; born 1961 in Tehran) is an Iranian linguist and Professor of Linguistics at the Institute for Humanities and Cultural Studies. He is a winner of Farabi International Award and is known for his research on Persian phonology, Persian grammar, Dependency grammar and Persian metres. Tabibzadeh received his BA in English from Shahid Bahonar University and his MA and PhD in linguistics from University of Tehran. Tabibzadeh previously taught at Bu-Ali Sina University. He is the editor-in-chief of the journal Language and Linguistics.

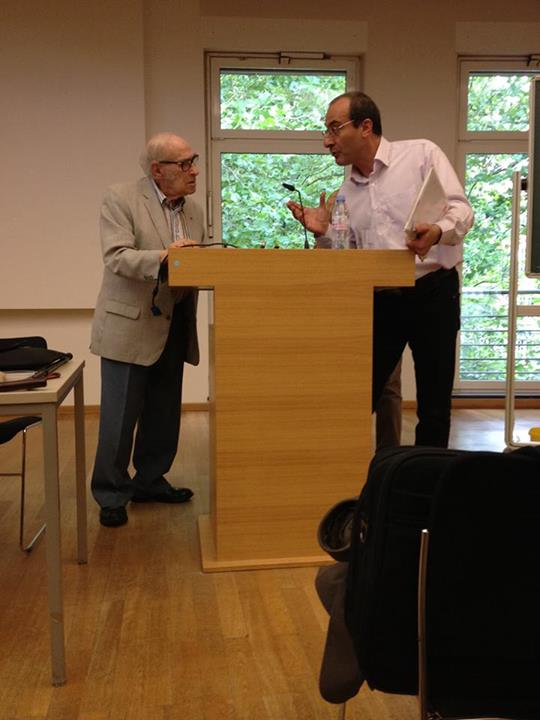
Gilbert Lazard (left) and Omid Tabibzadeh, 2013

== Books ==
- Metrics of the Persian Folk Poetry, Omid Tabibzadeh, Tehran: Niloufar, 2003
- Persian Grammar, Omid Tabibzadeh, Tehran: Markaz, 2012
- Verb Valency and Basic Sentence Structures in Modern Persian (A Dependency-Based Approach), Omid Tabibzadeh, Tehran: Markaz, 2006
