= Otto Hoynck =

Dutch Golden Age portrait painter (1630–c. 1707)

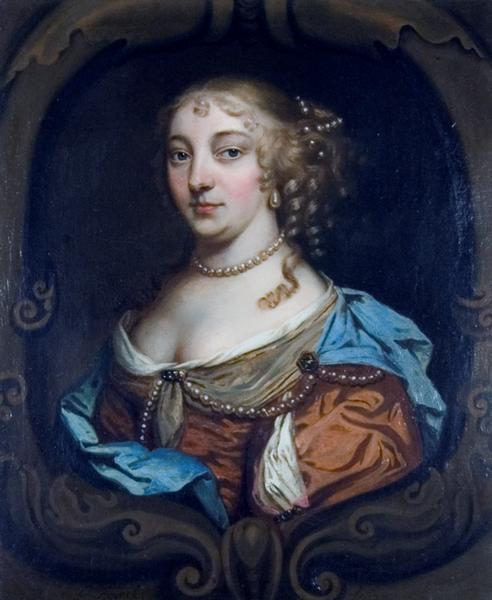
Portrait of Winifred, Countess of Coventry, 1686

Otto Hoynck (1630 – after 1706) was a Dutch Golden Age portrait painter active in England.

== Biography ==
According to the RKD he was born and trained in The Hague as a pupil of Arnold van Ravesteyn and Pieter Hermansz Verelst (Verelst became his brother-in-law). He moved to England after being registered in Amsterdam in 1686. Jacob Campo Weyerman listed him as Otto Hoijink.
