= Joseph Desmond O'Connor =

British linguist (1919–1998)

- Born: 10 December 1919; Harrogate
- Died: 15 July 1998 (aged 78)
- Known for: works on English phonetics
- Scientific career
- Fields: Phonetics
- Workplaces: University College London
- Doctoral students: Yadollah Samareh; John C. Wells; James Hurford

Joseph Desmond O'Connor (10 December 1919 – 15 July 1998) was a British linguist and Professor of Phonetics at University College London. A festschrift in his honour, edited by Jack Windsor Lewis, was published by Routledge in 1995.

== Books ==
- O’Connor, J. D. (1967). Better English pronunciation (rev. 1980). Cambridge University Press
- O’Connor, J. D. (1971). Advanced phonetic reader. Cambridge University Press
- O’Connor, J. D. (1973). Phonetics. Penguin
- O’Connor, J. D., & Arnold, G. F. (1961). The intonation of colloquial English. Longman
- O’Connor, J. D., & Arnold, G. F. (1973). The intonation of colloquial English (2nd ed.). Longman
- O’Connor, J. D., & Fletcher, C. (1989). Sounds English. Longman

== See also ==
- Daniel Jones (phonetician)
- A. C. Gimson
