= Advanced Cell Therapeutics =

Fraudulent US medical company

Advanced Cell Therapeutics (formerly known as BioMark International) was a company that marketed fraudulent medical treatments in the form of stem cell therapy, starting in 2002. It was originally located in Atlanta, and offered its services in the US and Europe, and was founded and run by Stephen van Rooyen and Laura Brown. After the US Food and Drug Administration closed the company down, van Rooyen and Brown fled to South Africa and started operating the business under the name Advanced Cell Therapeutics.

== History ==
Laura Brown was a former model and Stephen van Rooyen was a South African businessman who had migrated to the US. Neither had any formal medical training. They met in Malibu and learned about hematopoietic stem cells (HSCs) from an Atlanta-based osteopath named Mitchell Ghen, who had treated Brown's father. Ghen offered stem cell treatments for $26,000 until 2003, when the FDA shut down that part of his practice.

Brown and van Rooyen formed BioMark without Ghen in 2002, charging the same amount as Ghen had, and added six people to its scientific advisory board without their consent. An Atlanta immunologist, Howard Wajchman, isolated HSCs from blood sent to him by the company. An Atlanta physician named Dowman Covington originally administered the treatments for BioMark, but he stopped working with them in the spring of 2003 after they referred a person with a severe spinal cord injury to him. After that, BioMark either sent a representative to customers' homes to give them the treatments, or referred them to Christopher Goddard, medical director of a cord blood bank called Lifebank Cryogenics in Canada who licensed to practice medicine in British Columbia.

In 2003, the family of a person with ALS, who had become convinced that BioMark treatments could help him, called the FDA with questions about BioMark. They agreed to cooperate with the FDA and in November 2003 the FDA ran a sting operation, in which FDA agents observed a BioMark representative come to the family's home and prepare to give the treatment. The FDA agents stopped the man and questioned him; on the same day BioMark's offices were raided and the company's bank account holding about $250,000 was frozen. Brown and van Rooyen fled the US shortly after that. They were placed on the FBI Ten Most Wanted Fugitives and the FDA Most Wanted Fugitives lists.

In December 2004 the company started emailing people it had treated before, telling them the company had re-established operations in London and was offering the treatments in Tijuana and Rotterdam, and was accepting payments in a Swiss bank account. The Tijuana clinic was Corporativo Oncologico run by Armando Garcia. Brown and van Rooyen were in Cape Town, South Africa at that time, had changed their names to Sebastian Carlyle and Sean Castle, and had relaunched the company with the name Advanced Cell Therapeutics, Ltd. ACT was run out of a Cape Town office with twenty employees, although this was kept secret; the company website said it was based in Switzerland. ACT's website also offered testimonials from Goddard.

The Los Angeles Times published an exposé of BioMark in February 2005, including the story of a desperate Atlanta man with rapidly progressing ALS who paid BioMark $10,000 and was injected by Goddard in Toronto in 2003; his health continued to decline and he died in early 2004. Goddard resigned from Lifebank in April and came under investigation by Health Canada and the British Columbia Medical Association. A Canwest article focused on Goddard's role published in June 2005; it was syndicated in newspapers across Canada. It reported that BioMark had resumed business under the name Advanced Cell Therapeutics.

In March 2006 a US federal grand jury in Atlanta indicted Brown and van Rooyen on 51 counts of medical fraud. The US requested extradition from the South African government, and Brown and van Rooyen were arrested in Johannesburg by April. They began to fight their extradition.

In 2006 after tabloids in the UK published stories about spectacular recoveries after stem cell treatments, and after the Richard & Judy show hosted a doctor who administered them, demand for stem cell treatments in the UK was high. In March of that year The Guardian independently discovered that Advanced Cell Therapeutics was the same company as BioMark, and had taken over supplying the same clinics that BioMark had worked through, and that a London-based Dutch physician, Robert Trossel, had been offering ACT's stem cell therapy at his Preventative Medicine Center clinic in Rotterdam for £12,000.

BBC "Newsnight" then ran an investigative piece that found that ACT was acquiring the stem cells they were giving to people from a California-based research reagent company called AllCells; AllCells sold each vial of cells for $900, and the cells were intended only for laboratory research purposes. After this was made public, ACT shifted to supplying clinics with stem cells from a lab in Pakistan that did not keep records showing that the cells were made and packaged in a way that was safe for human use.

It also emerged that an Irish doctor, John Dunphy, had also been offering cells from ACT at his clinic in Cork. Dunphy said that he stopped offering the treatments when the 2 year grace period allowed under the 2004 EU Tissue Directive expired, bringing the directive into effect, and that he had applied to the Irish Medicines Board for a license to resume offering them. It emerged later, that Trossel had been administering stem cells at Dunphy's clinic as well. People were being charged €18,500 for the treatments in Cork. In May 2006 the Guardian published another story, revealing that Dunphy had a 400 patient waiting list when he stopped offering the treatments, and ACT had planned to get around the lack of licensure by offering the treatment on the Swansea Cork ferry, which travels through international waters. By that time Dunphy was under investigation by the Irish Medicines Board and the Irish Medical Council.

== Aftermath ==
In October 2006 the Dutch medical authority ordered the Rotterdam clinic to stop giving people stem cell therapy.

In 2010 Tossel was struck off by the General Medical Council for exploiting his vulnerable patients, including people with multiple sclerosis, by offering them fraudulent treatments in his London and Rotterdam clinics, and at Dunphy's clinic in Cork. The treatments included stem cells from ACT, and a treatment called "Aqua Tilis therapy" that involved "antioxidant steam" and electromagnetic therapy.

In 2010 Brown and van Rooyen were sued in civil court in South Africa by a woman from South Africa who was paralyzed, and who had been treated in Rotterdam through ACT in 2005 after paying the company R120,000. A woman who worked as a secretary at ACT at that time, testified that Brown and van Rooyen instructed her to lie to people about where the company was located and about the treatment, and that the owners knew that the stem cells they were giving people were not appropriate for humans, and that they spent the money they made lavishly on entertainment and luxuries for themselves. The woman who sued won her case in 2011, and as a result van Rooyen and Brown had to sell their mansion in order to pay the damages. Brown was reported to have died in 2011.

As of 2012 the extradition trial for van Rooyen was still working its way through the courts; the case hung on the fact that the extradition treaty had not been properly signed by the South African government. As of 2016 van Rooeyn was still on the FDA's most wanted list.

BioMark/ACT and Trossel's Preventive Medicine Center were in a first wave of companies and clinics offering untested stem cell therapy. Others included Stowe BioTherapy, Cells4Health run by Cornelis Kleinbloesem, the Beijing Xishan Institute for Neuroregeneration and Functional Recovery in Shijingshan run by Huang Hongyun, and EmCell in Kyiv, Ukraine run by Alexandr Smikodub. These clinics made strong claims about their outcomes, but rarely published their protocols or rigorous research showing therapies were safe and effective.

By 2012 a second wave of companies and clinics had emerged, usually located in developing countries where medicine is less regulated and offering stem cell therapies on a medical tourism model. Like the first wave companies and clinics, they have made similar strong claims and also have not published their protocols or rigorous research; Mexico, Thailand, and India have been centers of this activity, as has South Africa.
