= Owen Swiny =

Irish theatre impresario (1676–1754)

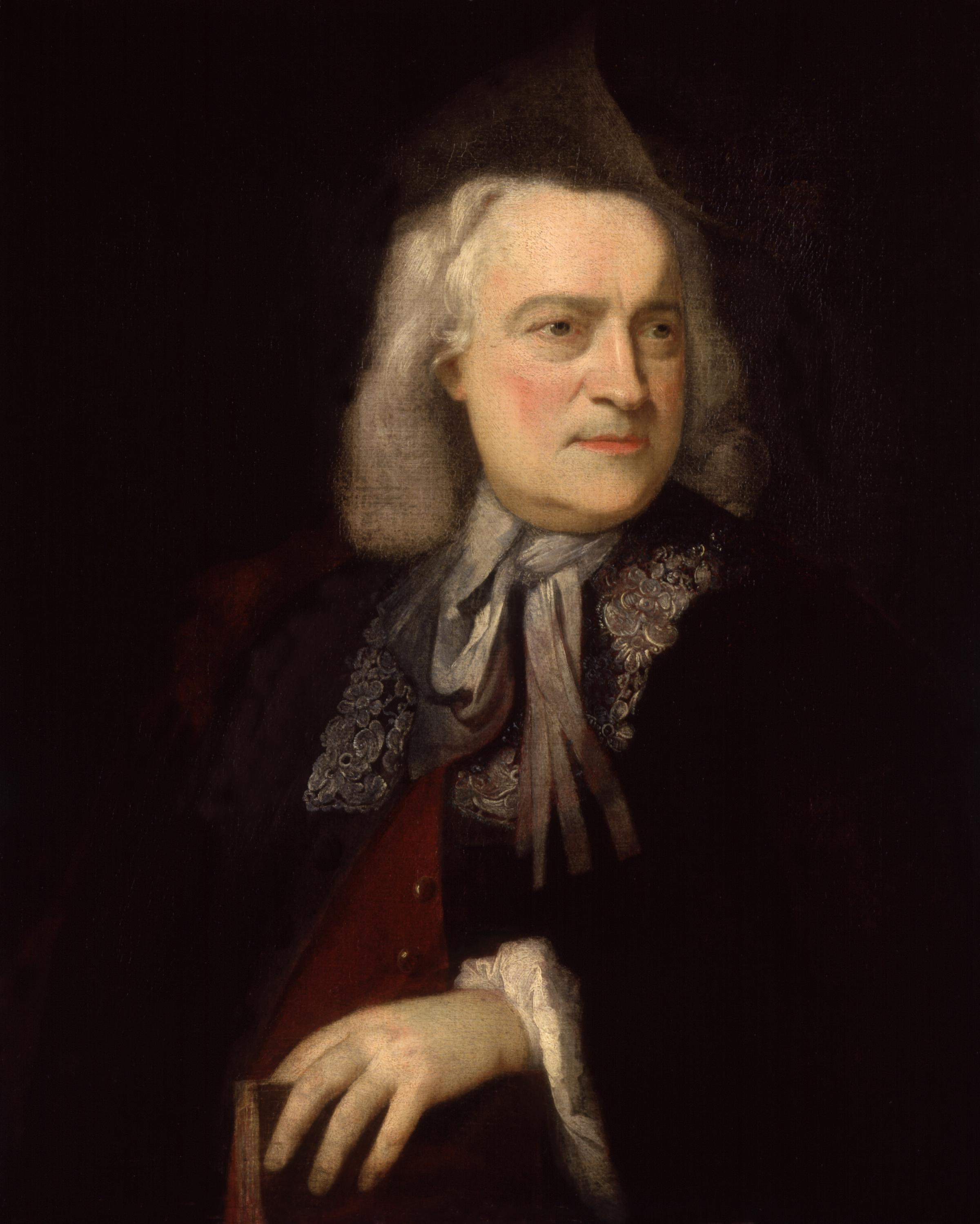
Owen Swiny by Peter van Bleeck, 1737 (National Portrait Gallery)

Owen Swiny (Also spelled McSwiny, Swiney, MacSwiny or MacSwinny) (1676 – 2 October 1754) was an Irish theatre impresario and art dealer active in London known for his work in popularising Italian opera in London and his agency in Venice. He knew and worked with Antonio Vivaldi and George Frederic Handel.

== Life ==
He was born near Enniscorthy, Ireland. Having attended Trinity College, Dublin from 1694, he was working at the Drury Lane Theatre by spring 1703 with Christopher Rich. He also adapted Molière's L'amour médecin as The Quacks, putting it on at the Drury Lane Theatre on 29 March 1705. In 1706, and in 1708 he spearheaded the London debut of Nicolini, whose performance of Pyrrhus and Demetrius Swiny had translated himself. With the rest of Rich's party, he was evicted from Drury Lane in 1709 by William Collier. In this time he had also quarrelled with Rich and poached Colley Cibber from him. After initial success with plays and opera there, Collier's court intrigues against Swiny led to his bankruptcy by January 1713. He then went traveling in France, the Netherlands and Italy, settling in Venice by 1721 as an agent signing Italian opera talent and works for the London stage and commissioning works from Italian artists for collectors back in England - those artists included Antonio Canaletto (on whose arrival in England in 1746 he introduced to the duke of Richmond) and Rosalba Carriera. While in Venice he lived in the home of English Consul Joseph Smith.

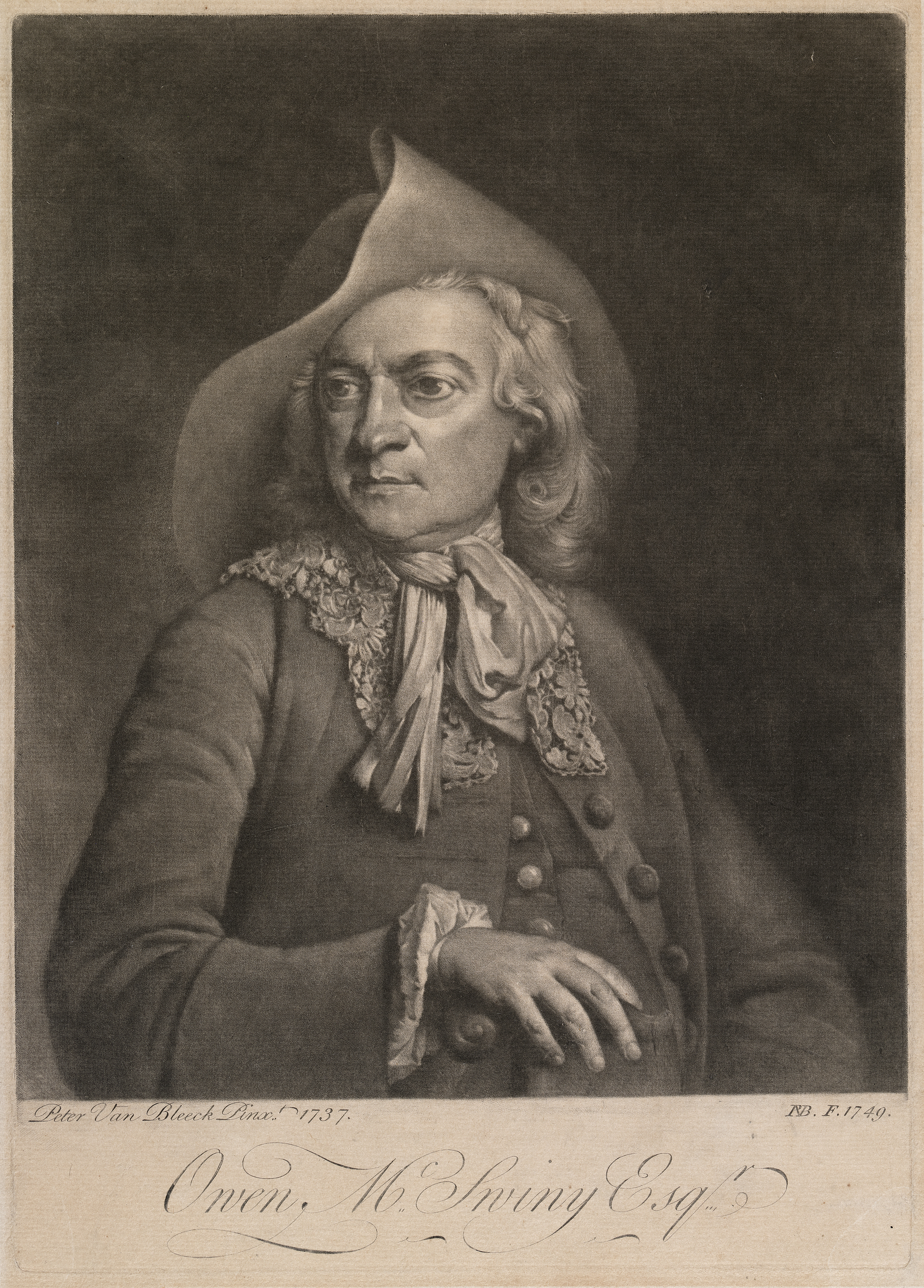

With Charles Lennox, 2nd Duke of Richmond as the project's main patron, McSwiny got together a Venetian-Bolognese team of painters (including Piazzetta, Sebastiano and Marco Ricci, Canaletto, G. B. Pittoni, Giovanni Battista Cimaroli, Donato Creti and Francesco Monti) in the 1720s to produce a series of twenty-four paintings. Twenty are known. They are of allegorical tombs primarily set in landscapes, commemorating English heroes of recent history, especially those involved with the Glorious Revolution. He intended to have the paintings engraved in a single volume, publishing the prospectus To the Ladies and Gentlemen of Taste of Great Britain and Ireland in the 1730s to try to raise the funding for this by subscription. When the volume finally came out, possibly first in 1736 in Paris and then in London in 1741, as Tombeaux des princes, grands capitaines et autres hommes illustres, qui ont fleuri dans la Grande-Bretagne vers la fin du XVII et le commencement du XVIII siècle, it included only nine of the paintings. McSwiny had planned a second series of six such paintings on the duke of Marlborough's deeds that remained incomplete on his death.

In around 1733, after about 20 years abroad, Swiny came back to London, where he won posts in the custom house and as Storekeeper of His Majesty's Stables in Ordinary and received a residence at the King's Mews. Benefit nights for him followed in 1735 and 1736, with the Opera of the Nobility's directors in 1736 considering sending him back to Italy to recruit singers. In 1737 he sat for his portrait from Peter van Bleeck, and the following year Jean Baptiste van Loo and Andrea Soldi also painted him. In around 1749 Swiny made a trip to Paris for John Rich, to arrange the London tour of Jean Monnet's troupe, before dying in London in 1754 and being buried in St Martin-in-the-Fields. His estate was left in trust for the actress Margaret (Peg) Woffington (for whose benefit his large paintings collection was also sold, in 1755), with his will leaving as trustees Robert Maxwell (secretary to the lord lieutenant of Ireland) and Francis Andrews (a lawyer and fellow of Trinity College, Dublin).
