= Tajik grammar =

This article describes the grammar of standard Tajik, one of the varieties of the Persian language, as spoken and written in Tajikistan, and Uzbekistan. In general, the grammar of Tajik Persian fits the analytical type. The case system has evolved, with grammatical relationships being primarily expressed via clitics, word order, and other analytical constructions. Like all other modern varieties of Persian, Tajik grammar is identical to classic Persian grammar, with only a few differences in some verb tenses.

== Nouns ==
Nouns are not marked for grammatical gender, but marked for number. Natural gender is usually distinguished by a change of word, like English, e.g. мурғ (murgh) 'fowl' and хурӯс (khurūs) 'rooster'. Alternatively the modifiers 'нар' (nar) for male or 'мода' (moda) for female can be pre or post-posed to the noun, e.g. хар-и нар (khar-i nar) 'male donkey' and хар-и мода (khar-i moda) 'female donkey'.

A definite article does not exist, although the definite direct object is marked by a suffix, -ро (-ro). The use of this suffix is mandatory when a previously referenced object is being talked about.

ин китобро хондам
in kitob-ro khondam
this book read-I
"I read this book"

китоб хондам
kitob khondam
book read-I
"I read a book"

Nouns may exhibit several suffixes. Of these suffixes, the plural marker is found first, followed by any possessive markers followed by the direct object marker. For example, in the following noun:

китобҳоятонро
kitobhoyatonro

This may be understood as [kitob [-ho pl [-yaton 2nd person pl. [-ro direct object marker] ] ] ], translation: "your (pl.) books"

=== Number ===
Two forms of number exist in Tajik, singular and plural. The plural is marked by either the suffix -ҳо (-ho) or -он (-on). While -ҳо can be used with any noun, the suffix -он is primarily used with animate nouns and has the variants -ён (-yon) which is used with words ending in -ӣ, ӯ or -о, -вон (-von) for words ending in у, and -гон (-gon) which is used with words ending in -а. For example, the singular for 'horse' is асп (asp), and the plural, 'horses' can be either аспҳо (aspho) or аспон (aspon). Typically, the -он (-on) ending is reserved for animate objects, although this is not always the case. For example, body parts that come in pairs, such as даст (dast), meaning "hand" and чашм (chashm), meaning "eye" are pluralized as дастон (daston) and чашмон (chashmon), respectively.

- ҷазира (jazira, island) – ҷазираҳо (jaziraho, islands)
- бунёдгаро (bunyodgaro, fundamentalist) – бунёдгароён (bunyodgaroyon, fundamentalists)
- парранда (parranda, bird) – паррандагон/паррандаҳо (parrandagon/parrandaho, birds)

For words ending in ӣ, the ӣ is shortened to и before suffixes

- моҳӣ (mohī, fish) – моҳиён/моҳиҳо (mohiyon/mohiho, fish[es])

=== Grammatical cases ===
Unlike in literary Tajik, the colloquial language has innovated a few more grammatical cases unheard of in any other variety of Persian, including:

Case	Ending
Nominative	-∅
Accusative Genitive	-а/-я (-a/-ya)
Dative	-ба (-ba)
Locative	-да (-da)

== Adjectives ==
There is no agreement of the adjective, or modifier with the head word. Adjectives do not take the plural markers -он or -ҳо. Typically, adjectives follow the nouns they modify, and are linked with the izofa construction, for example: китоби хуб (kitobi khub, good book) and китобҳои хуб (kitobhoi khub, good books). However, the superlative typically precedes the noun. For example,

кӯҳи баланд (kūhi baland, tall mountain)
кӯҳи баландтар (kūhi balandtar, taller mountain)
баландтарин кӯҳ (balandtarin kūh, tallest mountain)

Comparative forms use the suffix '-тар' (-tar), while superlative forms use the suffix '-тарин' (-tarin).

== Izofa-construction ==
The izofa construction (from classic Persian, meaning 'addition') is the name given to the combination of a head word and a modifier (for example an adjective) using the unstressed enclitic, -и, (-i). In the plural, the enclitic is placed after the plural marker.

духтари хушрӯй
dukhtar-i khushrūy
girl beautiful
"beautiful girl"

духтарони хушрӯй
dukhtaron-i khushrūy
girls beautiful
"beautiful girls"

Pronominal enclitics and the definite marker are placed at the end of the izofa construction, for example, китоби хубам (kitobi khubam), "my good book".

== Pronouns ==
Forms of the personal pronouns with English language equivalent(s).

Person	Singular	Plural
1st	ман (man) 'I'	мо (mo) 'we'
2nd	ту (tu) 'you' and Шумо (Shumo) [polite form of you]	шумо (shumo) or шумоён (shumoyon) 'you all'
3rd	ӯ, вай (ū, vay) 'he, she, it'	онҳо (onho) 'they'

The 2nd person plural, шумо also finds use as the polite form of the 2nd person. In written Tajik, this polite usage is distinguished by the capitalisation of the term шумо, for example, Шумо кай меоед? (shumo kay meoed?), trans. "when are you coming?" vs. шумо кай меоед?, trans. "when are you (all) coming?" ***Note in Northern Dialects of Tajik, the plural form of шумо is шумоён (shumoyon) and is conjugated as кай шумоён меоедетон? (kay shumoyon meoyedeton?) or when are you all coming?

=== Enclitic forms ===
There are enclitics used after words to denote possession.

Person	Singular	Plural
1st	-ам (-am) 'my'	-амон (-amon) 'our'
2nd	-ат (-at) 'your'	-атон (-aton) 'your'
3rd	-аш (-ash) 'his/her/its'	-ашон (-ashon) 'their'

For example: китоб (kitob, "book"), китобам (kitobam, "my book"), китобат (kitobat, "your book"). When following a vowel, for example китобҳо (kitobho, books), the leading '-а' is changed to '-я'. The phrase "their books", would be китобҳояшон (kitobhoyashon).

== Prepositions ==
Tajik	English
аз (az)	from, through, across
бо (bo)	with
бар (bar)	on, upon, onto
ба (ba)	to
бе (be)	without
дар (dar)	at, in
чун (chun)	like, as
то (to)	up to, as far as, until

== Verbs ==
Verbal conjugation is identical to that of other varieties of Persian, with only a few differences such as in compound tenses like the progressive tenses.

=== Infinitives and stems ===
Infinitives end in -тан (-tan) or -дан (-dan). The principal parts to remember are the past stem and present stem. The past stem is the easier to recognize, as it is determined simply by removing the -ан from the infinitive.

- кардан (kardan, to make/to do) – кард (kard)
- доштан (doštan, to have) – дошт (došt)
- пазируфтан (paziruftan, to accept) – пазируфт (paziruft)

The present stem tends to vary more, and in many common verbs bears little resemblance to the infinitive or past stem. In some verbs, the present stem is identical to the past stem, but for the -t/-d.

- кардан (kardan) – кун (kun)
- доштан (doštan) – дор (dor)
- пазируфтан (paziruftan) – пазир (pazir)

=== Participles ===
Tajik has two participles – past and present.

The past participle is formed by adding -а to the past stem

- кардан (kardan) – карда (karda)
- доштан (doštan) – дошта (došta)
- пазируфтан (paziruftan) – пазируфта (pazirufta)

The present participle is formed by adding -анда to the present stem

- кардан (kardan) – кунанда (kunanda)
- доштан (doštan) – доранда (doranda)
- пазируфтан (paziruftan) – пазиранда (paziranda)

=== Personal forms ===
Personal forms of verbs are formed mostly with simple prefixes and suffixes. Prefixes tend to be modal, while the suffixes are personal.

The personal suffixes are:

- -ам (1st person singular)
- -ӣ (2nd person singular informal)
  - -ед (2nd person singular polite in northern dialects)
- -ад (for non-past tenses), nul (for past tenses) (3rd person singular informal)
- -ем (1st person plural)
- -ед (southern dialects)/-едетон (northern dialects) (2nd person plural)
- -анд (3rd person plural)

The most important and common prefix is the progressive ме- (me-) which forms imperfective tenses.

Instructions for forming various tenses will be given below with example conjugations of the verb кардан. An example translation will be given for the 1st person singular to give a basic idea of the tense's use.

==== Simple past ====
The simple past is formed with the past stem and personal endings.

- ман кардам (I did)
- ту кардӣ
- ӯ кард
- мо кардем
- шумо кардед
- онҳо карданд

==== Present imperfect ====
The present imperfect is formed by prefixing ме- to the present stem with personal endings

- ман мекунам (I do)
- ту мекунӣ
- ӯ мекунад
- мо мекунем
- шумо мекунед
- онҳо мекунанд

==== Past imperfect ====
The past imperfect is formed by prefixing ме- to the simple past

- ман мекардам (I was doing)
- ту мекардӣ
- ӯ мекард
- мо мекардем
- шумо мекардед
- онҳо мекарданд

==== Present perfect ====
The present perfect is formed by adding the personal suffixes to the past participle.

- ман кардаам (I have done)
- ту кардаӣ
- ӯ карда
- мо кардаем
- шумо кардаед
- онҳо кардаанд

==== Pluperfect ====
The pluperfect is a compound tense formed from the past participle and the simple perfect of the verb будан (to be)

- ман карда будам (I had done)
- ту карда будӣ
- ӯ карда буд
- мо карда будем
- шумо карда будед
- онҳо карда буданд

==== Present and past progressive ====
The progressives are compound tenses. The present progressive is formed with the past participle and the present perfect of the verb истодан.

- ман карда истодаам (I am doing)
- ту карда истодаӣ
- ӯ карда истода
- мо карда истодаем
- шумо карда истодаед
- онҳо карда истодаанд

Similarly, the past progressive is formed with the past participle and the pluperfect of истодан.

- ман карда истода будам (I was doing)
- ту карда истода будӣ
- ӯ карда истода буд
- мо карда истода будем
- шумо карда истода будед
- онҳо карда истода буданд

==== Present subjunctive ====
The present subjunctive is formed from the present stem with personal endings.

- ман кунам (that I do)
- ту кунӣ
- ӯ кунад
- мо кунем
- шумо кунед
- онҳо кунанд

The subjunctive is different from other forms in that it is frequently dependent on another verb.

- Мехоҳам дуъо кунам (mexoham du'o kunam) – I want to pray

In this example, the subjunctive form кунам is dependent on мехоҳам (I want). As such, the subjunctive alone does not translate easily into English and the translation is heavily dependent on the context of the sentence.

== See also ==
- Persian grammar
- Tajik language
- Tajik alphabet
