= Dushyant Mahendrabhai Patel =

Indian-American businessman

Dushyant Mahendrabhai Patel (born 1958) is an Indian-American businessman who served as president of the company called AM2PAT Inc. based in Raleigh, North Carolina. Under his presidency, the company sold untested syringes of heparin that were tied to the deaths of at least five people and the hospitalizations of hundreds.

In 2009, Patel was listed as one of the most wanted fugitives sought by the United States Food and Drug Administration's Office of Criminal Investigations (OCI). The federal charges against him were dropped in 2021, by which time he had eluded capture for 12 years.
