= Arnold van Ravesteyn =

Dutch Golden Age painter (1605–1690)

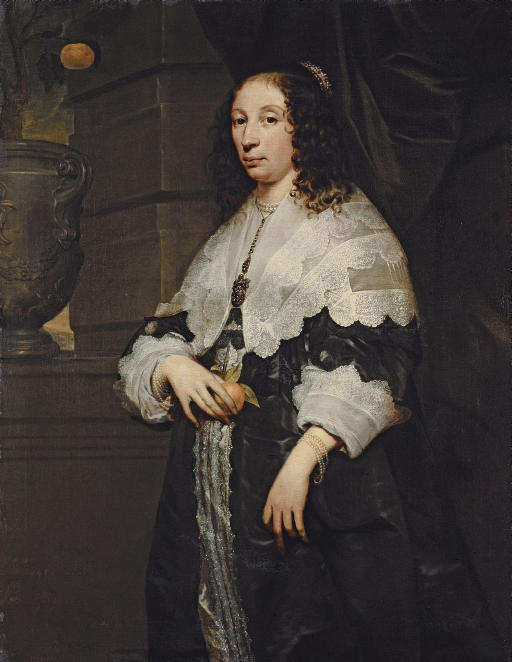
Portrait of a lady holding an orange

Arnold van Ravesteyn (1605–1690) was a Dutch Golden Age portrait painter.

== Biography ==
He was born and died in The Hague. According to the RKD he was a pupil of his father, the painter Anthonie van Ravesteyn, who became a member of the Haarlem Guild of St. Luke in 1639 and who became a member and founder of the Confrerie Pictura in 1656. He was the teacher of the painters Samuel Cabeljauw, Johannes Dabbe, Daniël Haringh, Job Houttuyn, Otto Hoynck, Willem Frederiksz van Royen, and Willem Wissing.
