= Willem Frederiksz van Royen =

Dutch Golden Age painter

- Born: 1645
- Died: 1723 (aged 77–78)

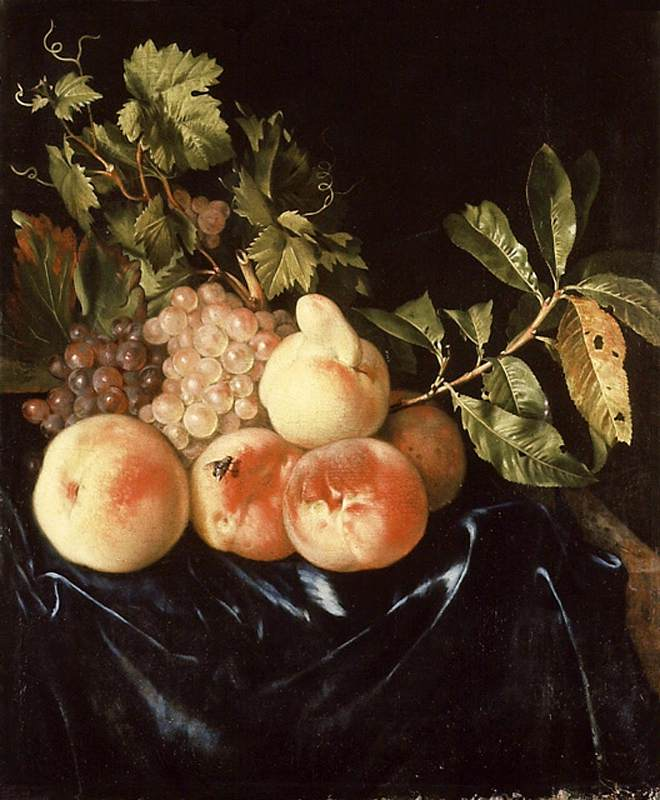
Still-life of peaches and grapes

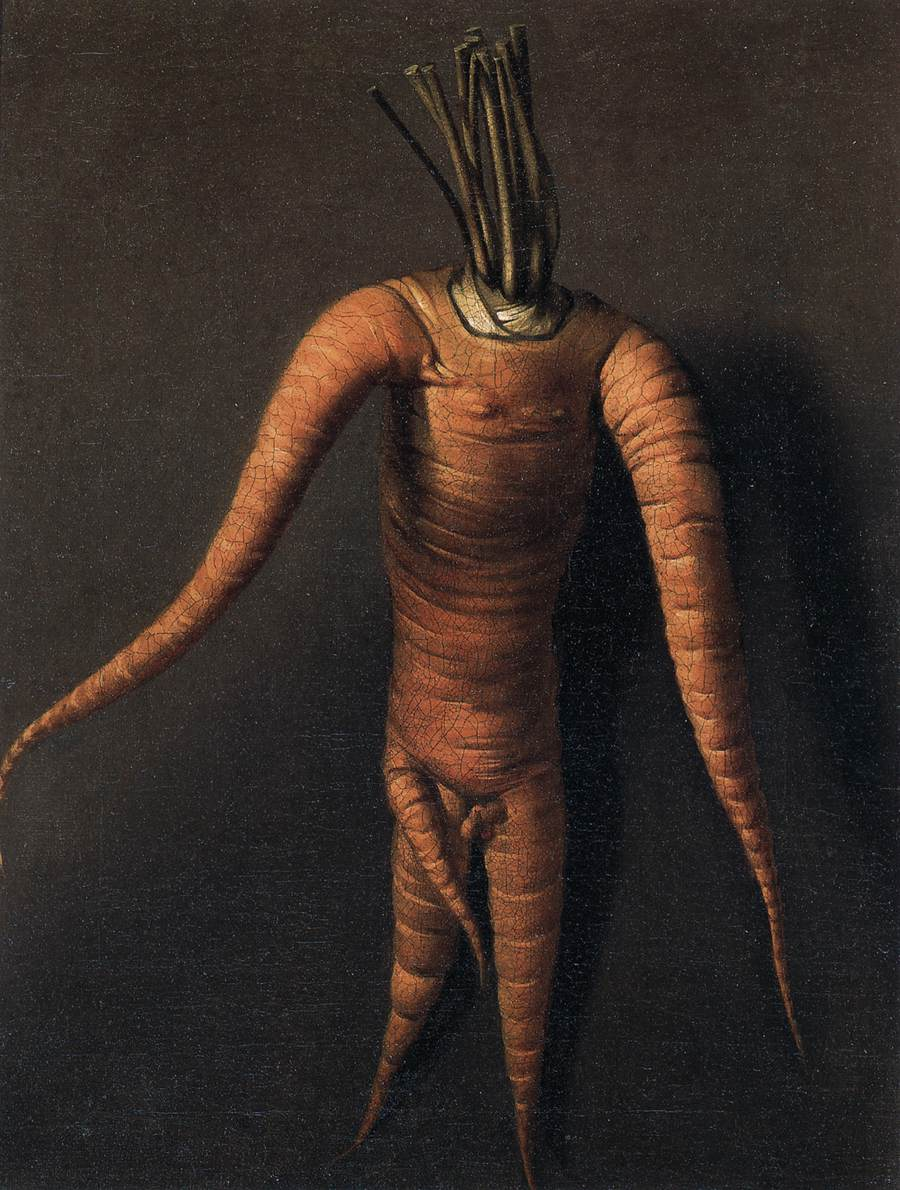
Willem van Royen – The Carrot

Willem Frederiksz van Royen (c.1645 – 1723) was a Dutch Golden Age painter.

== Biography ==
According to the RKD he was likely born in Haarlem and became a pupil of Arnold van Ravesteyn either there or in The Hague during the years 1661-1668. He became a still life and flower painter who moved to Berlin in 1669 and became court painter to Frederick William, Elector of Brandenburg after van Royen's predecessor, the flower painter Adriaen van der Spelt returned to the Netherlands. After a period in Potsdam in 1689, he became one of the founders of the Berlin academy in 1695, where he later died. Van Royen was also active in Amsterdam and made paintings in the dollhouse of Petronella de la Court (on display in the Rijksmuseum), together with his contemporaries Nicolaas Piemont and Johannes Voorhout. He should not be confused with the Amsterdam painter and draftsman Willem van Royen (1672-1742), who mostly painted birds.
