= Richard van Bleeck =

Dutch Golden Age painter

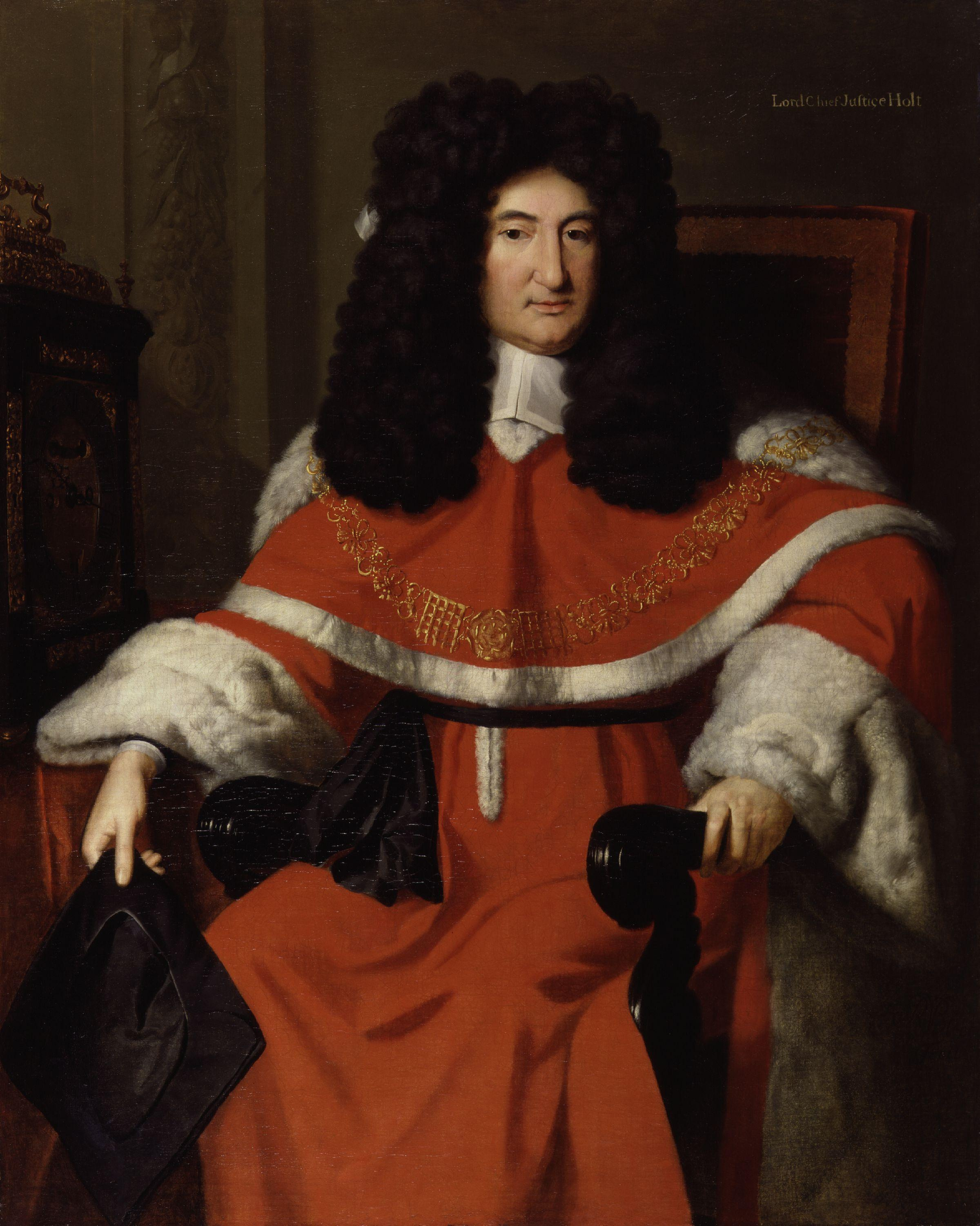
Portrait of Sir John Holt, c. 1700

Richard van Bleeck (1670–1733) was a Dutch Golden Age painter.

He was born in The Hague. According to the Netherlands Institute for Art History, he was the pupil of Theodor van der Schuer and Daniel Haringh. He became a portrait painter and painted the portrait of the engraver Coenraet Roepel, before moving to London in 1733, where he stayed. He was the father of Pieter van Bleeck, who was born in the Hague, possibly moved with him to London and also became a portrait painter there.
