= Van Rooi =

van Rooi is a surname. Notable people with the surname include:

- Ashley van Rooi (born 1988), Namibian cricketer
- Burton van Rooi (born 1982), Namibian cricketer

Surname was also part of black society in Namibia back in the days. But was shortened to Rooi during the time of the apartheid regime, because van Rooi sounds more whitish.
