= Willem Hendrik Wilhelmus van Royen =

Dutch Golden Age painter

- Born: 1672; Amsterdam
- Died: 1742 (aged 69–70); Amsterdam

Willem Hendrik Wilhelmus van Royen (1672 – 1742) was a Dutch Golden Age painter from the Dutch Republic.

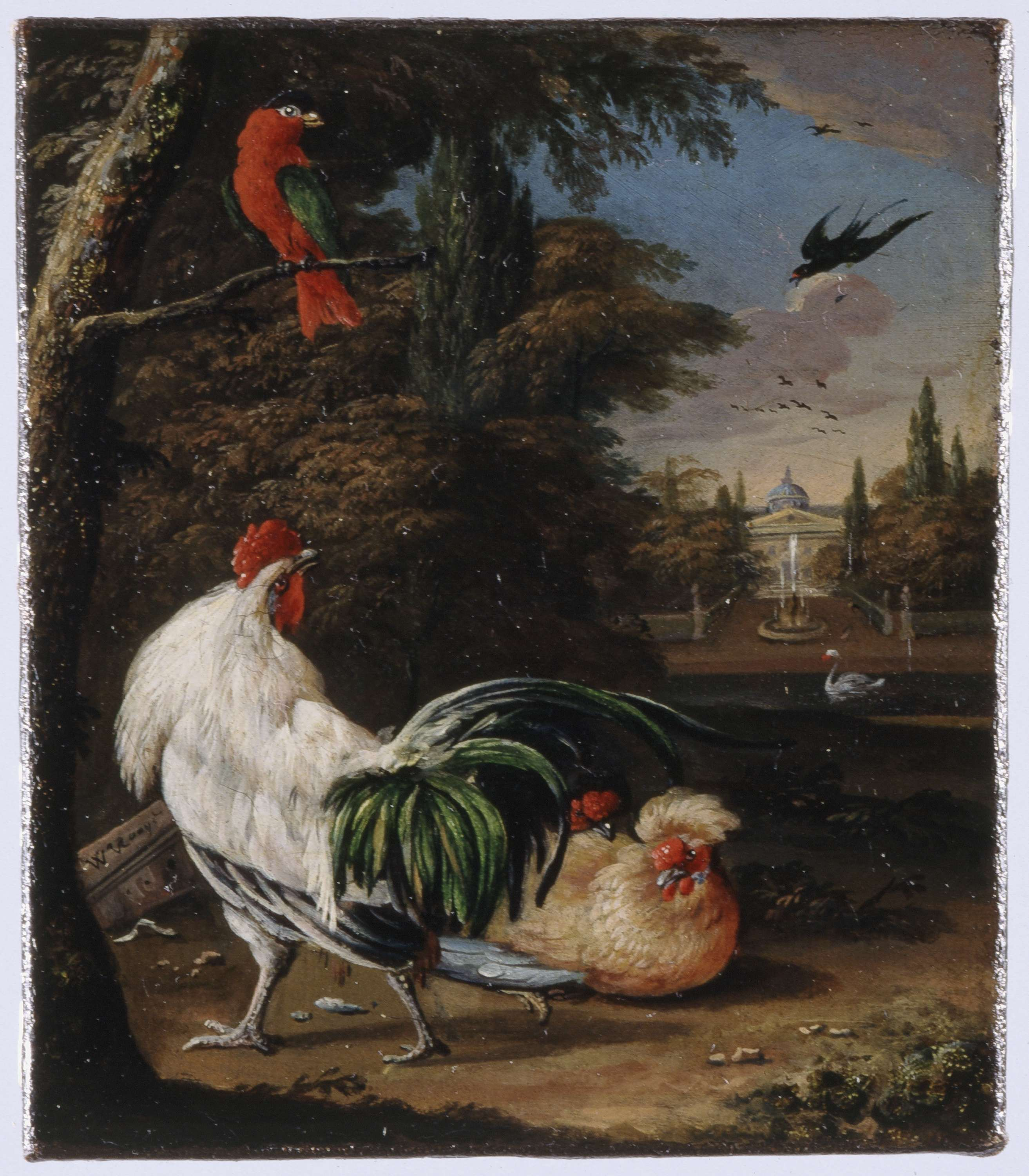
Birds in a Park, work in the manner of Hondecoeter, 1690 - ca.1710

Royen was born in Amsterdam, where it is unknown from whom he learned to paint, but based on stylistic analysis he has been determined to be a follower of Melchior d'Hondecoeter. His works have been confused in the past with those of Willem Frederiksz van Royen, a Dutch Golden Age painter active in Berlin.

Royen died in Amsterdam.
