= Persian grammar =

Grammar of the Persian language

The grammar of the Persian language is similar to that of many other Indo-European languages. Persian became a more analytic language around the time of Middle Persian, with fewer cases and discarding grammatical gender. The innovations remain in Modern Persian, which is one of the few Indo-European languages to lack grammatical gender, even in pronouns.

== Word order ==
While Persian has a standard subject-object-verb (SOV) word order, it is not strongly left-branching. It uses prepositions, not postpositions, and is mainly a head-initial language. Persian is a pro-drop language since its verbs have unambiguous personal suffixes and so the use of pronouns is optional. Thus, the subject mark often appears as a suffix at the very end of the sentence.

- کتاب آبی را دیدم ketâb-e âbî râ dîdam "I saw the blue book"
- کتاب آبی را دیدید ketâb-e âbî râ dîdîd "you (plural) saw the blue book"

The main clause precedes a subordinate clause, often using the familiar Indo-European subordinator ke ("which").

- به من گفت که امروز نمی‌آمد be man goft ke emrûz nemî âmad "he told me that he wasn't coming today"

The interrogative particle âyâ (آیا), which asks a yes–no question, appears in written Persian at the beginning of a sentence. Grammatical modifiers, such as adjectives, normally follow the nouns that they modify with the suffix ezâfe (اضافه), but occasionally precede nouns. Persian is one of the few SOV languages to use prepositions. The only case marker in the written language, râ (را) (replaced in the spoken language by ـ رو ro or ـو o), follows a definite direct object noun phrase.

- کتاب آبی را از کتابخانه گرفت ketâb-e âbî râ az ketâbxâne gereft "she got the blue book from the library"

Normal sentences are subject-prepositional phrase-object-verb. If the object is specific, the order is (S) (O + râ) (PP) V. However, Persian has a relatively free word order, which is often called scrambling, since its parts of speech are generally unambiguous, and prepositions and the accusative marker help to disambiguate the case of a given noun phrase. That characteristic allows Persian to have a high degree of flexibility for versification and rhyming.

== Articles ==
In the literary language, no definite article ("the") is used; rather, it is implied by the absence of the indefinite article ("a, an"). However, in the spoken language, the stressed suffix ـه -e or -a is often used as a definite article; -e is used mostly in urban areas and in newer dialects, and -a is used mostly in rural areas and in older dialects. Persian consonants and vowels have changed throughout history.

- Literary: کتاب روی میز است ketâb rû-ye mîz ast "the book is on the table".
- Spoken: کتابه روی میزه ketâbe rû-ye mîzé "the book is on the table".

For plural nouns, the definite plural marker ـها -hâ functions as both the plural marker and the definite article.

The indefinite article in both spoken and literary Persian is the same as the word for 1, یک yek, which is often shortened to یه ye.

- روی میز یک کتاب است rû-ye mîz yek ketâb ast 'on the table there is a book'.

== Nouns ==
=== Gender ===
Persian nouns and pronouns have no grammatical gender.

=== Plural ===
All nouns can be made plural by the suffix ـها -hâ, which follows a noun and does not change its form. Plural forms are used less often than in English and are not used after numbers or زیاد ziyâd "many" or بسیار(ی) besyâr(i). ـها -hâ is definite and is used only if the noun has no numbers before it.

- سه تا کتاب se tâ ketâb "three books"
- بسیاری کتاب besyâr-i ketâb "X'many books"
- کتاب‌های بسیار ketâbhâ-ye besyâr "many books"
- کتاب‌ها ketâbhâ "the books"
- من کتاب را دوست دارم man ketâb râ dûst dâram "I like the book"
- آنها دانشجو هستند ânhâ dâneşcû hastand "They are students"
- آنها دانشجوها هستند ânhâ dâneşcûhâ hastand "They are the students"

In the spoken language, when nouns or pronouns end with a consonant, -hâ is reduced to -â.

- Literary: آنها ânhâ 'they'
- Informal spoken: unâ 'they'

In the literary language, animate nouns generally use the suffix ـان -ân (or variants ـگان -gân and ـیان -yân) for plurals, but ـها -hâ is more common in the spoken language.

- Literary: پرندگان parandegân 'birds'
- Spoken: پرنده‌ها parandehâ 'birds'

Nouns adopted from Arabic usually have special plurals, formed with the ending ـات -ât or by changing the vowels: کِتاب ketâb / کُتُب kotob for "book/books". Arabic nouns can generally take Persian plural endings, but the original form is sometimes more common. The most common plural form depends on the individual word. That is similar to "indexes" vs. "indices" in English for the plural forms of a word adopted from Latin.

=== Cases ===
There are three cases in Persian: the nominative (or subject) case, the vocative case and the accusative (or object) case. The nominative is the unmarked form of a noun, but the vocative and the accusative cases use the suffixes ـا "â" and "ـرا "râ" (and ـرو "ro" or ـو "o" in Tehrani accent, sometimes -a in Dari accent), respectively. The other oblique cases are marked by prepositions.

- Nominative: کتاب آنجاست ketâb ânjâst / کتاب‌ها آنجایند ketâbhâ ânjâyand ('the book is there / the books are there');

Inanimate subjects do not require plural verb forms, especially in the spoken language: ketâbhâ unjâst ('the books "is" there').

- Vocative: سعدیا مرد نکونام نمیرد هرگز Sa'diyâ marde nekû-nam namîrad hargez.
- Accusative: کتاب را (کتابو) بده به من ketâb râ (ketâbo) bede(h) be man 'give me the book'.
- Possession using ezâfe: کتابِ آرش ketâb-e Âraş 'Âraş's book'.

== Pronouns ==
=== Subject pronouns ===
Persian is a null-subject and pro-drop language. The personal pronouns (e.g. 'I', 'he', 'she') are optional. Pronouns add râ when they are used as the object but otherwise stay the same. The first-person singular accusative form من را man râ 'me' can be shortened to marâ or, in the spoken language, mano. Pronominal genitive enclitics (see above) are different from normal pronouns, however.

Literary forms
Person	Singular	Plural
1st	man مَن	mâ ما
2nd	to تو	şomâ شُما
3rd	ū او (human) ân آن (non-human), vey وَی* (human only, literary)	ânhâ آنها (non-human/human), işân ایشان (human only and formal)

* rarely used

Spoken forms
Person	Singular	Plural
1st	man مَن	mâ ما
2nd	to تُو	şomâ شُما
3rd	u او işân ایشان* (honorary)	ânhâ/ânân آنها/آنان (normal), işân ایشان (honorary)

* uses 3rd person plural verb form

Persian resembles Romance languages like French in that the second person plural pronoun şomâ is used as a polite form of address. Persian to is used among intimate friends (the so-called T–V distinction).

- ببخشید، شما آمریکایی هستید؟ Bebaxşîd, şomâ Âmrikâyî hastîd? 'excuse me, are you an American?'
- ایشان به من گفتند برویم تو İşân be man goftand, berîm tû 'he said to me, "Let's go in." '

=== Possessive determiners ===
Possession is often expressed by adding suffixes to nouns; the same suffixes can also be used as object pronouns. For the third person these are gender-neutral (unlike in English); for example, کتابش ketâbaš could mean 'his book' or 'her book'.

Possessive determiners (literary forms)
Person	Singular	Plural
1st	-am ـَم	-emân ـِمان
2nd	-at ـَت	-etân ـِتان
3rd	-aş ـَش	-eşân ـِشان

Possessive determiners (Iranian dialectal forms)
Person	Singular	Plural
1st	-am ـَم	-emun ـِمون
2nd	-et ـِت	-etun ـِتون
3rd	-eş ـِش	-eşun ـِشون

Examples:

- کتابتان روی میزه ketâbetun rû-ye mîze 'your book is on the table'
- کتابم روی میز است ketâbam rû-ye mîz ast 'my book is on the table'

When the stem to which they are added ends in a vowel, a y is inserted for ease of pronunciation. However, with the plural marker ـها -hâ, it is also common in Iranian dialects to drop the -a-/-e- stem from the possessive marker. For example, 'my cars' could be translated as either ماشین‌هایم mâşînhâyam with the -y- or ماشین‌هام mâşînhâm. It can be simplified even more to the colloquial spoken form by dropping h, for ease of pronunciation, to ماشینام mâşînâm. Sometimes, ها -hâ is written attached to the word: ماﺷﯿﻨﻬﺎ mâşînhâ.

=== Ezâfe ===
Another way of expressing possession is by using subject pronouns or a noun phrase with ezâfe. Although in the third person this implies a change of person. These can also never be used as a possessive or direct object within a clause in which the same is the subject of the verb.

- کتابِ شما روی میزه ketâb-e şomâ rû-ye mîze 'your book is on the table'.
- کتابِ من روی میزه ketâb-e man rû-ye mîze 'my book is on the table'.
- کتابِ استاد رویِ میز است ketâb-e ostâd rû-ye mîz ast 'the professor's book is on the table'.
- اکبر برادرِ او را دید Akbar barâdar-e u râ dîd 'Akbar saw his(i.e.: someone else's) brother'.
- اکبر برادرش را دید Akbar barâdareş râ dîd 'Akbar saw his(i.e.: his own or someone else's) brother'.
- Correct: برادرم را دیدم barâdaram râ dîdam 'I saw my brother'.
- Incorrect: برادرِ من را دیدم barâdar-e man râ dîdam Since the subject pronoun is used as a possessive pronoun as well with ezafe construction.

=== Object pronouns ===
Object pronouns are the same as subject pronouns (followed by the postposition را râ), but objects can also be marked with the possessive determiners described above, which get attached to the verbs instead of nouns and do not need the postposition; consider the example "Yesterday I saw him" shown below.

Direct object incorporation
Transliteration	Persian	Notes
dîrûz û râ dîdam	دیروز او را دیدَم	Postposition را râ needed when using a subject pronoun as an object pronoun.
dîrûz dîdamaş	دیروز دیدَمَش	No postposition needed; possessive determiner attached to the verb.

=== Demonstrative pronouns ===
The demonstrative pronouns are این (în, this) and آن (ân, that) respectively. Their plural forms can be اینها (înhâ, these) and آنها (ânhâ, those) for inanimate nouns, or اینان (înân, these) and آنان (ânân, those) for animate nouns. Note that آن and آنها are also used as third-person subject pronouns.

Demonstratives can also be combined with the indefinite pronouns یکی (yekî, one) and یکی‌ها (yekîhâ, ones) to give: این یکی (în yekî, this one), آن یکی (ân yekî, that one), این یکی‌ها (în yekîhâ, these ones) and آن یکی‌ها (ân yekîhâ, those ones).

== Adjectives ==
Adjectives typically follow the nouns that they modify by using the ezâfe construct. However, adjectives can precede nouns in compounded derivational forms such as xoš-baxt (literally 'good-luck') 'lucky', and bad-kâr (literally 'bad-deed') 'wicked'. Adjectives can come in any different orders after a noun and, in that case, show emphasis.

The comparative form ('more ...') is the suffix -tar (تَر), and the superlative ('the most ...') is the suffix -tarin (تَرین).

Comparatives that are used attributively follow the nouns that they modify, but superlatives precede their nouns.

The word 'than' is expressed by the preposition از (az):

سگ من از گربهٔ تو کوچک‌تر است
sag-e man az gorbe-ye to kuçektar ast
'my dog is smaller than your cat'

== Verbs ==
Normal verbs can be formed by the following pattern:

NEG – DUR or SUBJ/IMPER – root – PAST – PERSON – OBJ

- Negative prefix: na, which changes to ne before the Imperfective prefix (ne-mî-)
- Imperfective or durative prefix: mî-
- Subjunctive/Imperative prefix: be-
- Past suffix: -d, which changes to -t after unvoiced consonants
- Personal suffix: e.g. -am 'I', -i 'you (sg.)' etc.
- Object suffix: the most commonly used is -aš or -eš 'him/her/it'

Person Suffixes (Literary Forms)
Person	Singular	Plural
1st	ـَم -am	ـیم -îm
2nd	ـی -î	ـید -îd
3rd	ـَد -ad*	ـَند -and

* In the past tense, the past stem alone is used without any ending (e.g. رفت raft, not رفتد *raftad)

Person Suffixes (Spoken Forms)
Person	Singular	Plural
1st	ـَم -am	ـیم -îm
2nd	ـی -î	ـید/ـین -îd/-în
3rd	ـه -e*	ـَن -an

* In the past tense, the past stem is used alone, without any ending (رفت raft, not رفته *rafte).

Object suffixes (Literary Forms)
Person	Singular	Plural
1st	ـَم -am	ـِمان -emân
2nd	ـَت -at	ـِتان -etân
3rd	ـَش -aş	ـِشان -eşân

Object suffixes (Spoken Forms)
Person	Singular	Plural
1st	ـَم -am	ـِمون -emûn
2nd	ـِت -et	ـِتون -etûn
3rd	ـِش -eş	ـِشون -eşûn

=== Tenses ===
Here are the most common tenses:

==== Infinitive ====
The infinitive ending is formed with ـَن (-an): خوردن xordan 'to eat'. The basic stem of the verb is formed by deleting this ending: خورد xord.

==== Past ====
The past tense is formed by deleting the infinitive ending and adding the personal endings to the stem. In the third person singular, however, there is no personal ending so خوردن xordan would become خورد xord, 'he/she/it ate'.

==== Imperfect ====
The imperfect tense is made by taking the past tense as described above and prefixing it with می mî-, thus می‌خوردم mîxordam 'I was eating', 'I used to eat'. This tense can also have a conditional meaning: 'I would eat', 'I would have eaten'.

==== Perfect ====
The perfect tense is formed by taking the stem of the verb, adding ـه e to the end and then adding the different persons of the present tense of 'to be'. So خوردن xordan in the perfect first person singular would be خورده‌ام xordeam 'I have eaten' and the 3rd person singular would become خورده است xorde ast. However, in the spoken form, ast is omitted, making خورده xorde 's/he has eaten".

==== Pluperfect ====
The pluperfect tense is formed by taking the stem of the perfect (خورده xorde), adding بود bud, and then adding the personal endings: خورده بودم xorde bûdam 'I had eaten'. In the third person-singular, بود bud is added, with no ending.

==== Future ====
The future tense is formed by taking the present tense form of خواستن xâstan 'to want' and conjugating it to the correct person; that verb in the third person singular is خواهد xâhad. Next, it is put in front of the shortened infinitive of the verb (خورد xord, which forms خواهد خورد xâhad xord 'he/she/it will eat'). For compound verbs, such as تمیز کردن tamîz kardan 'to clean', خواهد xâhad is between both words, and کردن kardan is reduced to its stem to form تمیز خواهد کرد tamîz xâhad kard 'he/she/it will clean'. In the negative, خواهد xâhad has نـ na- added to form نخواهد خورد naxâhad xord 'he will not eat'. The future tense is generally avoided in colloquial Persian.

==== Present ====
The present tense is formed by taking the present stem of the verb, adding the prefix می mî-, and conjugating it. The present stem is often not predictable from the infinitive and so it must be learned separately. The present stem of the verb خوردن xordan 'to eat', for example, is خور xor, and so the present first-person singular is می‌خورم mîxoram 'I eat, am eating, do eat'. The third-person singular ending is ـد -ad. The negative نـ is pronounced as ne- before mî-, but in all other tenses, it is pronounced as na-. Frequently, the present tense is used with an adverb (such as فردا fardâ 'tomorrow') instead of the future tense described above.

- فردا به سينما می‌رود fardâ be sînemâ mîravad 'tomorrow he will go to cinema'

==== Present subjunctive ====
The present subjunctive is made by changing the prefix mî- of the present tense to بـ be- or bo- (before a verb with the vowel o): ﺑﺨﻮورم boxoram 'I may eat, let me eat', ﺑﻨﻮيسم benevîsam 'I may write', 'let me write'.

=== Compound verbs ===
Light verbs such as کردن kardan 'to do, to make' are often used with nouns to form what is called a compound verb, light verb construction, or complex predicate. For example, the word گفتگو goftegu means 'conversation', while گفتگو کردن goftegu kardan means 'to speak'. One may add a light verb after a noun, adjective, preposition, or prepositional phrase to form a compound verb. Only the light verb (such as kardan) is conjugated; the preceding word it is not affected:

- دارم گفتگو می‌کنم dâram goftegu mîkonam 'I am speaking'
- گفتگو کرده‌ام goftegu kardeam 'I have spoken'
- گفتگو خواهم کرد goftegû xâham kard 'I will speak'

Here are other examples of compound verbs with kardan:

- فراموش کردن farâmûş kardan 'to forget'
- گریه کردن gerye kardan 'to cry'
- تلفن کردن telefon kardan 'to call, to telephone'
- بازسازی کردن bâzsâzî kardan 'to fix'

=== Auxiliary verbs ===
- باید bâyad 'must': Not conjugated. The dependent clause is subjunctive.
- شاید šâyad 'might': Not conjugated. The dependent clause is subjunctive.
- توانستن tavânestan 'can' (literally 'to be able to'): Conjugated. The dependent clause is subjunctive.
- خواستن xâstan 'want': Conjugated. The dependent clause is subjunctive.
- خواستن xâstan 'will': Conjugated. The main verb is tenseless.

=== Simplified spoken verbs ===
In the spoken language, certain common verbs are pronounced in a shortened form:

- رفتن raftan 'to go' (Literary present form rav-) Spoken present form r-: mîram 'I go', mîrî 'you go', berîm 'let's go'
- دادن dâdan 'to give' (Literary present form deh-) Spoken present form d-: mîdam 'I give', mîdîm 'we give'
- گفتن goftan 'to say' (Literary present form gu-) Spoken present form g-: mîgam 'I say', mîgîn 'you say'
- آمدن âmadan 'to come' (Literary present form ây-) Spoken present form â-: miyâm 'I am coming'
- خواستن xâstan 'to want' (Literary present form xâh-) Spoken present form xâ-: mîxâm 'I want'

== Prepositions ==
Prepositions in Persian generally behave like in English and precede their object. They come in two kinds: the basic prepositions such as dar 'in', which are placed directly before the noun or pronoun without an ezâfe, and a more numerous class, which comes from nouns or adverbs that are joined to the following noun by an ezâfe (-e or -ye). Here are some prepositions:

- az (اَز) 'from'
- bâ (با) 'with'
- bar (بَر) 'on'
- barâ-ye (بَرایِ) 'for'
- be (به) 'to'
- bî (بی) 'without'
- dar (دَر) 'in'
- mânand-e (مانَنْدِ) 'like'
- mesl-e (مِثْلِ) 'like'
- rû-ye (رویِ) 'on'
- tâ (تا) 'till, until'
- tû-ye (تویِ) 'in'
- zîr-e (زیرِ) 'under'

== See also ==
- Persian language
- Tajik grammar
- Kurdish grammar

== Sources ==
- Abrahams, Simin (2005). Modern Persian: A Course-Book. Routledge.
- Bleeck, Arthur Henry (1857). A Concise Grammar of the Persian Language.
- Brookshaw, Dominic Parviz (2010). The Routledge Introductory Persian Course: Farsi Shirin Ast. Routledge.
- Boyle, John Andrew (1966). Grammar of Modern Persian. Harrassowitz, Wiesbaden.
- Dahlén, Ashk (2010). Modern persisk grammatik (4th edition 2024) (Swedish)
- Doctor, Sorabshaw Byramji (1875). A New Grammar Of The Persian Tongue, Part 1, Accidence: For The Use Of The Higher Classes In Schools And Colleges (reprinted 2010).
- Elwell-Sutton, L.P. (1963). Elementary Persian Grammar.
- Forbes, B. (1985). A Grammar of the Persian Language (reprinted 2003).
- Forbes, Duncan (1869). A Grammar of the Persian Language (4th edition).
- Ibrahim, Meerza Mohammad (1841). A Grammar Of The Persian Language: To Which Are Subjoined Several Dialogues; With An Alphabetical List Of The English And Persian Terms Of Grammar.
- Johnson, Edwin Lee (1917). Historical Grammar of the Ancient Persian Language.
- Jones, Sir William (1771). A Grammar of the Persian Language.
- Kent, Roland G. (1950). Old Persian: Grammar, Texts, Lexicon.
- Lambton, Ann K.S. (1953) Persian Grammar. Cambridge University Press.
- Lazard, Gilbert; Lyon, Shirley A. (1993). A Grammar of Contemporary Persian (Persian Studies, No 14) (paperback).
- Mace, John (2003). Persian Grammar: For Reference and Revision. Routledge Curzon.
- Mahootian, Shahrzad (1997). Persian (Descriptive Grammars).
- Obolensky, Serge; Yazdan Panah, Kambiz; Khaje Nouri, Fereidoun (1963). Persian Basic Course units 1–12. Foreign Service Institute, Washington. (Republished as Spoken Persian in 1973.)
- Phillott, D. C. (1919) Higher Persian Grammar: For The Use Of The Calcutta University, vols, 1 and 2. (reprinted 2008)
- Platts, John T. (1894). A Grammar of the Persian language, Part I, Accidence.
- Rafiee, Abdi (1975). Colloquial Persian. Routledge.
- Rosen, Friedrich (reprinted 2010). Modern Persian Colloquial Grammar: Containing a Short Grammar, Dialogues and Extracts from Nasir-Eddin Shah's Diaries, Tales, Etc., and a Vocabulary (originally written in German in 1890).
- St. Clair-Tisdall, William (1902). Modern Persian Conversation-Grammar; With Reading Lessons, English-Persian Vocabulary and Persian Letters.
- Stilo, Donald L.; Clinton Jerome (1994). Modern Persian: Spoken and Written.
- Thackston, Wheeler M. (1993) An Introduction to Persian (3rd edition). IBEX.
- Windfuhr, Gernot L. (1979). Persian Grammar: History and State of Its Study (Trends in Linguistics State of the Art Reports, No 12).
- Windfuhr, Gernot L. (1980). Modern Persian: Intermediate level 1. University of Michigan Press.
- Yousef, Saeed & Torabi, Hayedeh (2012): Basic Persian: A Grammar and Workbook. Routledge.
- Yousef, Saeed & Torabi, Hayedeh (2013): Intermediate Persian: A Grammar and Workbook. Routledge.
