= Daniel Jones (phonetician) =

British phonetician (1881–1967)

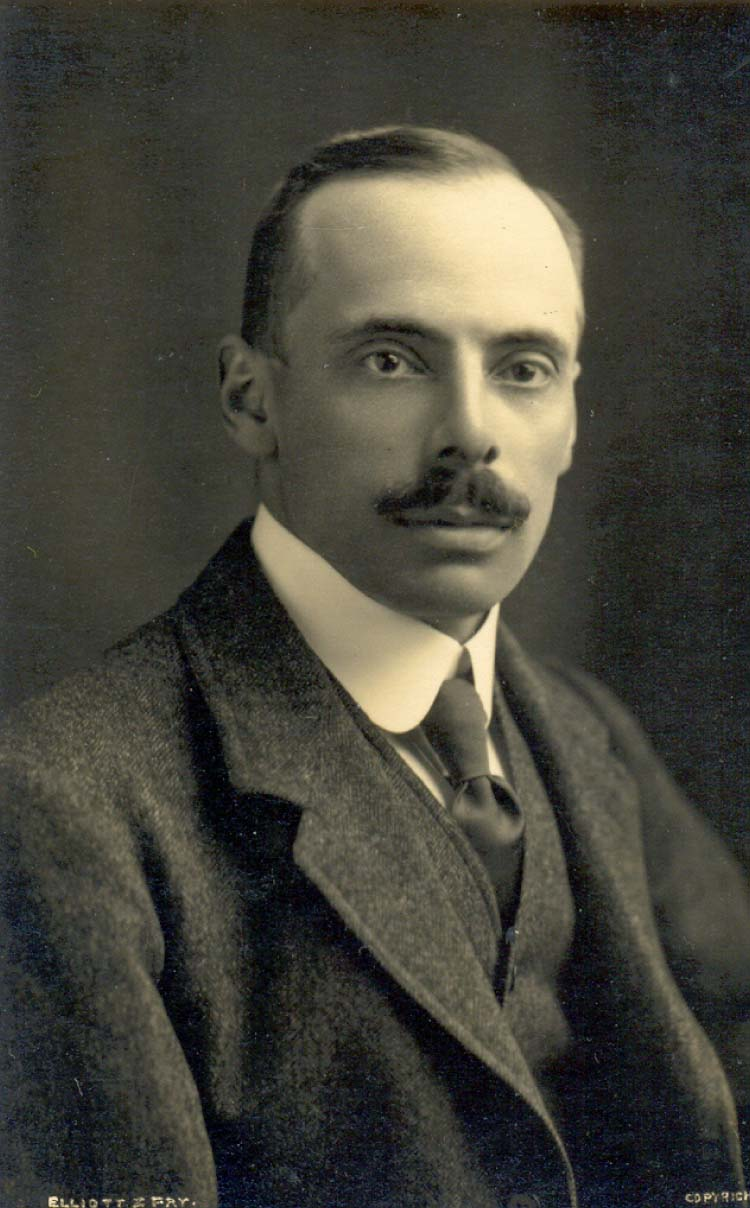
- Daniel Jones, age 40
- Born: 12 September 1881; London, England
- Died: 4 December 1967 (aged 86); Gerrards Cross, Buckinghamshire, England
- Education: University of Cambridge
- Occupation: Phonetician
- Employer: University College London
- Known for: The cardinal vowel diagram
- Notable work: The English Pronouncing Dictionary

Daniel Jones (12 September 1881 – 4 December 1967) was a British phonetician who studied under Paul Passy, professor of phonetics at the École des Hautes Études at the Sorbonne (University of Paris). He was head of the Department of Phonetics at University College London.

== Biography ==
In 1900, Jones studied briefly at William Tilly's Marburg Language Institute in Germany, where he was first introduced to phonetics. In 1903, he received his BA degree in mathematics at the University of Cambridge and by right his MA in 1907. From 1905 to 1906, he studied in Paris under Paul Passy, who was one of the founders of the International Phonetic Association, and in 1911 he married Passy's niece Cyrille Motte. He briefly took private lessons from the British phonetician Henry Sweet.

In 1907 he became a part-time lecturer at University College London and was afterwards appointed to a full-time position. In 1912 he became the head of the Department of Phonetics and was appointed to a chair in 1921, a post he held until his retirement in 1949. From 1906 onwards Jones was an active member of the International Phonetic Association; he held the roles of assistant secretary (1907 to 1927), secretary (1927 to 1949), and president (1950 to 1967).

In 1909 Jones wrote the short Pronunciation of English, a book he later radically revised. The resulting work, An Outline of English Phonetics, followed in 1918 and is the first comprehensive description of British Received Pronunciation, and the first such description of the standard pronunciation of any language.

The year 1917 was a landmark for Jones in many ways. He became the first linguist in the western world to use the term phoneme in its current sense, employing the word in his article "The phonetic structure of the Sechuana Language". Jones had made an earlier notable attempt at a pronunciation dictionary but it was now that he produced the first edition of his famous English Pronouncing Dictionary, a work which in revised form is still in print. It was here that the cardinal vowel diagram made a first appearance.

== Development of the cardinal vowel diagram ==
The problem of the phonetic description of vowels is of long standing, going back to the era of the ancient Indian linguists. Three nineteenth-century British phoneticians worked on this topic. Alexander Melville Bell (1867) devised a phonetic alphabet which included an elaborate system for vowels. Alexander John Ellis had also suggested vowel symbols for his phonetic alphabets. Sweet did much work on the systematic description of vowels, producing an elaborate system of vowel description involving a multitude of symbols. Jones however was the one who is generally credited with having gone much of the way towards a practical solution through his scheme of 'cardinal vowels', a relatively simple system of reference vowels which for many years has been taught systematically to students within the British tradition. Much of the inspiration for this scheme can be found in the earlier publications of Passy.

The standard IPA vowel trapezium, an application of Jones's work.

A representation of Jones's original vowel trapezium.

In the original form of the cardinal vowels, Jones employed a dual-parameter system of description based on the supposed height of the tongue arch together with the shape of the lips. This he reduced to a simple quadrilateral diagram which could be used to help visualize how vowels are articulated. Tongue height (close vs. open) is represented on the vertical axis and front vs. back on the horizontal axis indicates the portion of the tongue raised on the horizontal axis. Lip-rounding is also built into the system, so that front vowels (such as [i, e, a]) have spread or neutral lip postures, but the back vowels (such as [o, u]) have more marked lip-rounding as vowel height increases. Jones thus arrived at a set of eight "primary Cardinal Vowels", and recorded these on gramophone disc for His Master's Voice in 1917.

Later modifications to his theory allowed for an additional set of eight "secondary Cardinal Vowels" with reverse lip shapes, permitting the representation of eight secondary cardinal vowels (front rounded and back unrounded). Eventually, Jones also devised symbols for central vowels and positioned these on the vowel diagram. He made two further disc recordings for Linguaphone in 1943 and 1956.

In recent years the accuracy of many of Jones's statements on vowels has come increasingly under question. Most linguists now consider that the vowel quadrilateral must be viewed as a way of representing auditory space in visual form, rather than the tightly defined articulatory scheme envisaged by Jones. Nevertheless the International Phonetic Association still uses a version of Jones's model, and includes a Jones-type vowel diagram on its influential International Phonetic Alphabet leaflet contained in the "Handbook of the International Association". Many phoneticians (especially those trained in the British school) resort to it constantly as a quick and convenient form of reference.

Although Jones is especially remembered for his work on the phonetics and phonology of English, he ranged far more widely. He produced phonetic/phonological treatments which were masterly for their time on the sound systems of Cantonese, Tswana (Sechuana as it was then known), Sinhalese, and Russian. He was the first phonetician to produce, in his "Sechuana Reader", a competent description of an African tone language, including the concept of downstep. Jones helped develop new alphabets for African languages, and suggested systems of romanisation for Indian languages and Japanese. He also busied himself with support for revised spelling for English through the Simplified Spelling Society.

Apart from his own vast array of published work, Jones acted as mentor to numerous scholars who later went on to become famous linguists in their own right. These included such names as Lilias Armstrong, Harold Palmer, Ida C. Ward, Hélène Coustenoble, Arthur Lloyd James, Dennis Fry, A. C. Gimson, Gordon Arnold, J.D. O'Connor, Clive Sansom, and many more. For several decades, his department at University College was pivotal in the development of phonetics and in making its findings known to the wider world. Beverley Collins and Inger M. Mees (1998) speculate that it is Jones, not as is often thought Sweet, who provided George Bernard Shaw with the basis for his fictional character Professor Henry Higgins in Pygmalion.

After retirement, Jones worked at his publications almost up to the end of his life. He died at his home in Gerrards Cross in Buckinghamshire on 4 December 1967.

== Collections ==
Jones' archive was deposited at University College London in 1993 and 2024. The collection contains personal history, documents relating to Jones' time at the Department of Phonetics, lecture notes, and research material.
