= Dennis Fry =

British linguist

Dennis Butler Fry
- Born: 3 November 1907; Stockbridge, Hampshire, United Kingdom
- Died: 21 March 1983 (aged 75); London, United Kingdom
- Known for: Works on English phonetics

Academic work
- Discipline: Linguist
- Sub-discipline: Phonetics
- Institutions: University College London
- Doctoral students: Neil Smith

Dennis Butler Fry (3 November 1907 – 21 March 1983) was a British linguist and Professor of Experimental Phonetics at University College London. Through experiments he conducted in the 1950s and 1960s, Fry demonstrated that lexical stress correlated with loudness, pitch, and duration of the affected vowel.

== Books ==
- Fry, D.B. (ed.) (1976). Acoustic phonetics: a course of basic readings. Cambridge: CUP
- Fry, D.B. (1977). Homo loquens: man as a talking animal. Cambridge: CUP
- Fry, D.B. (1979). The physics of speech. Cambridge: CUP
- Fry, D.B. and Kostić, Đ. (1939). A Serbo-Croat phonetic reader. London: University of London Press
- Whetnall, E. and Fry, D.B. (1964). The deaf child. London: Heinemann
- Whetnall, E. and Fry, D.B. (1970). Learning to hear. London: Heinemann

== See also ==
- Daniel Jones (phonetician)
- A. C. Gimson
