= Peter van Bleeck =

Dutch painter

Petrus Bleeck
- Born: 1697
- Died: 20 July 1764 (aged 66–67); London, England, Great Britain
- Burial place: London, England, United Kingdom
- Parent: Richard Bleeck

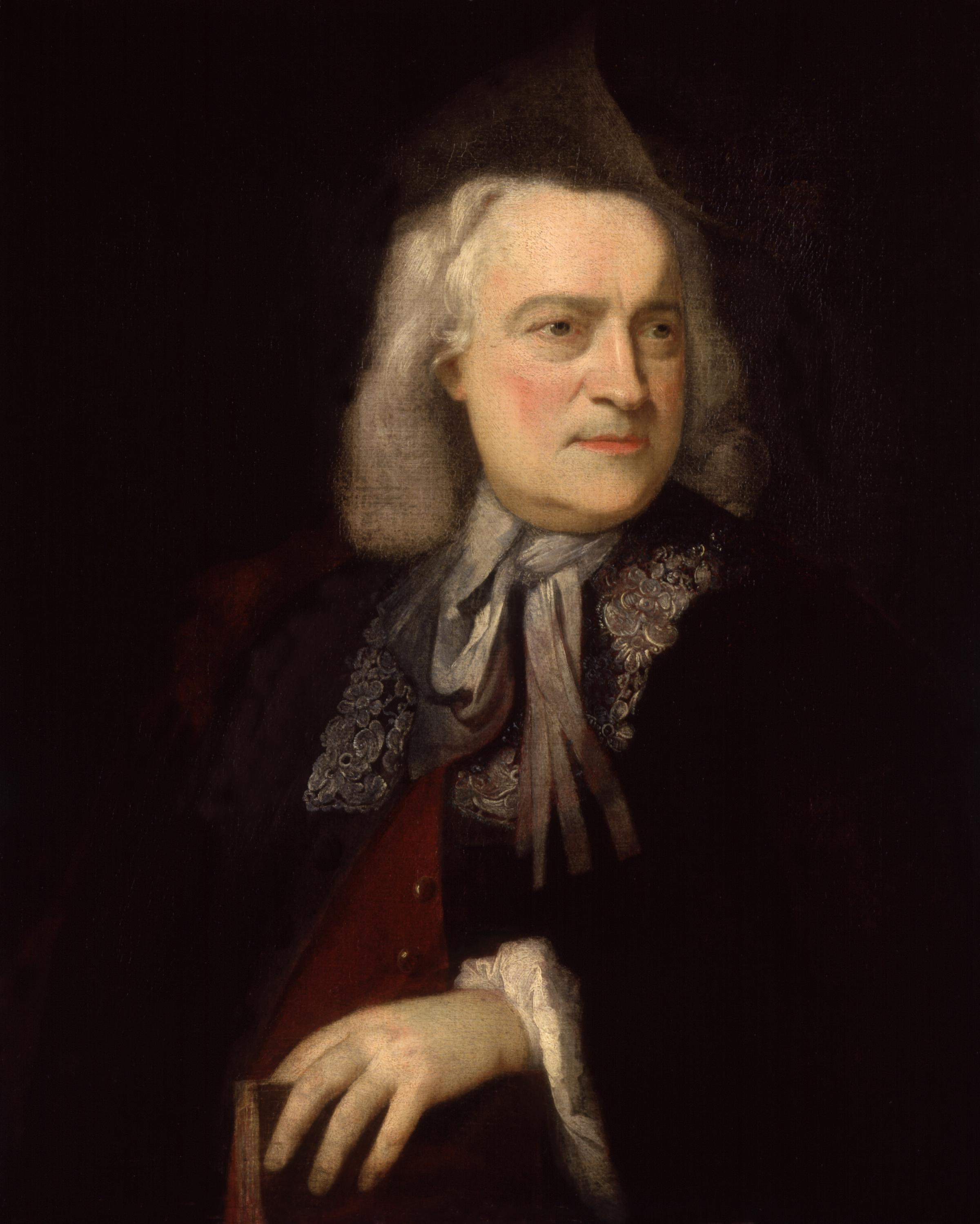
Owen Swiny by Peter van Bleeck, 1737 (National Portrait Gallery)

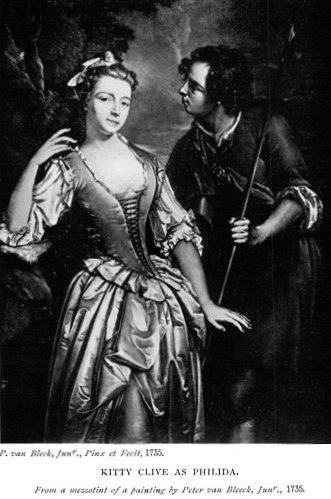
Kitty Clive in her role as Philida, 1735, by Peter van Bleeck

Petrus Johannes (Pieter) van Bleeck (baptized 25 June 1697 in The Hague – 20 July 1764) was a Dutch portrait painter and mezzotint engraver active in London, where he moved in 1723.

Van Bleeck is especially known for theatrical subjects such as Owen Swiny, Kitty Clive and Margaret Woffington, but he also worked on other subjects such as James Foster. His paintings were frequently engraved, particularly by John Faber the Younger. Peter engraved a portrait of Ellen "Nell" Gwynne by Sir Peter Lely.

He was the son of Richard van Bleeck, also a portrait painter.

== Personal life ==
Van Bleeck married Alice Cony in 1745 at St Paul's Cathedral London, in the Parish of St Benets near Pauls Wharf St Andrew. His Marriage Bond allegation of 8 October (his notice of intent to marry) alleges he was a Bachelor from the Parish of Covent Garden, age 40 and she was a spinster age 35 from the Parish of St George the Martyr. He was granted license to marry and they did so, on 10 October 1745. His age was understated as he would have been around 48 years old at the time of his marriage. There were no children of this marriage.

== Death ==
Van Bleeck died in July 1764 and was buried in London's Old St. Pancras Churchyard on 30 July 1764. A survey of 1795 states the grave is against the outer north wall of the original church. His Epitaph, as transcribed on page 43 in the 1869 book by Frederick Teague Cansick reads: Here Lies the Remains of Peter Van Bleeck Esq., worthy son of Richard van Bleeck Esq., A Gentleman of distinguished merit in every light, whether of husband, friend, citizen or Christian. Having married in 1746 (sic) Alicia, youngest daughter of William Corry Esq., of Walpole in Norfolk, whom he left without issue, he died on the 21st July 1764 age 67. Merritismo conjugi Moestissima conjux H.C.P.C. R.Q.I.P
