= Royal Association for Deaf people =

British charity (1841-pres.)

- Founded: 1841; 185 years ago
- Registration no.: 1081949
- Purpose: providing accessible service to deaf people
- Region served: United Kingdom
- Services: Charitable services
- Revenue: £3,224,647 in 2019/20
- Employees: 69 in 2019/20
- Volunteers: 21 in 2019/20
- Website: royaldeaf.org.uk
- Formerly called: Institution of providing Employment, Relief and Religious Instruction for the Adult Deaf and Dumb; Royal Association in Aid of the Deaf and Dumb; Royal Association in aid of Deaf People

The Royal Association for Deaf people (RAD) is a British charitable organisation whose mission is to promote the welfare and interests of Deaf people. It is a Deaf-led organisation.

Using uppercase letter "D" in deaf refers to the group of deaf people who share a language and culture and whose first or preferred language is sign language". Lowercase "d" in deaf refers to the audiological condition of not hearing.

== History ==
RAD is the oldest British organisation for adult deaf people. It was founded in 1841 as the Institution of providing Employment, Relief and Religious Instruction for the Adult Deaf and Dumb. In 1876 Queen Victoria agreed to become the organisation's patron and it became the Royal Association in Aid of the Deaf and Dumb (RADD). In 1986 its name changed to the Royal Association in aid of Deaf People. The charity retains a strong base of Deaf clubs across London and the South East.

== Services ==
=== Legal, Advocacy and Employment Services ===
RAD supports Deaf people to achieve independence and help them with understanding rights and finances. It provides employment and legal advice, and specialist support for Deaf people from black and ethnic minority communities. The charity's legal service started in 2007. Over the four years to 2011, it supported "nearly 1,500 cases, with employment, welfare benefits, discrimination and housing the most in-demand areas of law".

=== Children, Families and Youth Service ===
RAD provides activities and support groups for families with parents and/or children who are deaf or hard or hearing. It also runs activities which give deaf teenagers skills and confidence for adulthood.

=== Deaf Community Development ===
By working with Deaf clubs and other self-help groups, RAD provides Deaf people with places to meet as well as social and leisure activities.

=== Interpreting ===
RAD provides British Sign Language/English Interpreters, Deafblind Interpreters, Lipspeakers, Note-takers and Speech to Text Reporters. There is also an emergency service that is available 24 hours a day, 365 days a year.

=== Social care ===
Specialist support is provided for Deaf people who are old, or have learning disabilities and/or mental health challenges, and the people who care for them.

=== Specialist church and chaplaincy services ===
The RAD has worked with the Diocese of London in the provision of chaplaincy services for deaf and deaf blind people in London. A full-time priest is employed as Chaplain to the Deaf community in London, and for almost 150 years, the RAD maintained a specialist church and social centre, St Saviour's Centre for the Deaf, at Acton from which the Deaf Chaplain worked. Opening in 1873, and moving to the Acton site in 1925, the church provided a focus for worship, teaching, and social activities across the capital. St Saviour's was the only English church ever designed specifically for the Deaf community, in both its architecture, and its fixtures and fittings. St Saviour's church was owned by the RAD, but owing to loss of funding the St Saviour's church and centre closed at the end of September 2014.
