= FDA Most Wanted Fugitives =

List of wanted criminals

The FDA Most Wanted Fugitives is a list of the top fugitives sought by the United States Food and Drug Administration's Office of Criminal Investigations (OCI). The OCI is responsible for the enforcement of laws related to FDA-regulated products.

As of 2024 the list includes:

| Name | Born | Wanted for |
|---|---|---|
| Rajendra Singh Kanyal | 1981, India | Counterfeit drug distribution |
| Nuritsa Grigoryan | 1955, Armenia | Unlicensed medical practice, drug adulteration |
| Hadi Mo Ghandour | 1971, Lebanon | Counterfeit drug distribution |
| Cellou Jumaine | 1965, Burundi | Distribution of counterfeit toothpaste containing toxic substances |
| Abigail Bridgmon | 1978, Philippines | Counterfeit drug distribution |
| Bo Jiang | 1978, China | Counterfeit drug distribution |
| Stephen Mark Van Rooyen | 1962, South Africa | Sold untested and unlicensed stem cell treatments |

== See also ==
- FBI Ten Most Wanted Fugitives
- List of scientific misconduct incidents
