= EU Tissue Directive =

The EU Tissue Directive —Directive 2004/23/EC— sets standards of quality and safety for the donation, procurement, testing, processing, preservation, storage and distribution (including import and export in/out of the EU) of human tissues and cells intended for human application. It was adopted by the European Parliament on 7 April 2004 and came into effect between 7 April 2006 and 7 April 2007. The directive is implemented by the two technical directives 2006/17/EC and 2006/86/EC. Only licensed centres in the EU are allowed to handle human tissues and cells intended for human application. The directive does not deal with matters in relation to research using human tissue and cells.

The European Union has funded a collaborative research network (Tiss.EU) to ascertain the current state of legal and ethical affairs in the European Union and the effect of the directive on the normative landscape.
