= Gordon Frederick Arnold =

British linguist (1920–1999)

- Born: 22 January 1920
- Died: 30 December 1999 (aged 79)
- Education: University College London
- Known for: works on English phonetics
- Scientific career
- Fields: Phonetics
- Workplaces: University College London

Gordon Frederick Arnold (22 January 1920 - 30 December 1999) was a British linguist and Emeritus Reader in Phonetics at University College London.

== Biography ==
Born in 1920 in Braintree, Essex, Arnold read French at University College London. In 1947 he was appointed Assistant Lecturer in the Department of Phonetics by the head of department Daniel Jones. During his life he played a substantial role in the administration of the college, becoming Senior Tutor in 1979.

== Books ==
- Arnold, G.F. and Gimson, A.C (1965). English Pronunciation Practice. London: University of London Press
- Intonation of Colloquial English, with J. D. O'Connor (Longman, 1961; second edition, 1973)
- English Words (North-Holland, 1957)
- Say it with Rhythm, with O.M. Tooley (Longman, three parts, 1971–73)

== See also ==
- Daniel Jones (phonetician)
- A. C. Gimson
