= Arthur Henry Bleeck =

British orientalist

Arthur Henry Bleeck (1829–1877) was a British orientalist. He was born on 18 May 1829 in Westbury, Wiltshire, the son of William Bleeck (1801/2–1873), who was from 1830 rector of Huish, Wiltshire, and his wife, Charlotte, née Goodman.

Bleeck worked for some time in the British Museum, where his linguistic capacity made him useful. He later went out to the East during the Crimean War, and until the conclusion of peace held a post in connection with the land transport corps at Sinope. Refused readmission to the British Museum on his return to England, he worked for several years for Muncherjee Hormusjee Cama, who employed him to prepare an English version of the Avesta. He died in January 1877.

== Bibliography ==
- A Practical Grammar of the Turkish Language, with dialogues and vocabulary (in conjunction with W. Burckhardt Barker), London, 1854, 8vo.
- A Concise Grammar of the Persian Language, containing dialogues, reading lessons and a vocubulary: together with a new Plan for facilitating the Study of Languages, and specimens in Arabic, Armenian, Bengálí, Greek, Georgian, Hindústání, Hebrew, Latin, Persian, Russian, Sanskrit, Swedish, Syriac, and Turkish. London, 1857.
- Catalogue of the Napoleon Library in the possession of Mr. Joshua Bate. London, privately printed (1858).
- Avesta: the religious books of the Parsees; from Professor Spiegel's German translation of the original manuscripts, 3 vols., London, 1864.
- Avesta: The Religious Books of the Parsees. Volumes 1-3. Adamant Media Corporation. 2001. ISBN 978-1421205007
- A Concise Grammar of the Persian Language. BiblioLife (2008) ASIN B01MF9AYPU
