= A. C. Gimson =

English phonetician

- Born: 7 June 1917
- Died: 22 April 1985 (aged 67)

Academic background
- Education: University College London
- Influences: Daniel Jones

Academic work
- Discipline: Phonetician
- Institutions: University College London
- Influenced: John C. Wells

Alfred Charles "Gim" Gimson (/ˈɡɪmsən/; 7 June 1917 – 22 April 1985) was an English phonetician.

== Life ==
Gimson was educated at Emanuel School London, and University College London, where later in 1966 he became Professor of Phonetics, and in 1971 head of the Department of Phonetics and Linguistics.

He was a pupil and colleague of Daniel Jones, and is known for having updated and extended Jones's description of standard British English pronunciation (Received Pronunciation, or RP). Through his Introduction to the Pronunciation of English, first published in 1962, Gimson became an authority on Received Pronunciation. He succeeded Jones as editor of the English Pronouncing Dictionary, making significant changes to its content and presentation. He was known to generations of students and colleagues simply as 'Gim'.

== Books ==
- Arnold, G.F. and Gimson, A.C (1965). English Pronunciation Practice. London: University of London Press
- Gimson, A.C (1962). Introduction to the Pronunciation of English. London: Arnold. Fourth edition (1989) revised by Ramsaran, S.; sixth edition (2001) revised by Cruttenden, A.
- Gimson, A.C (1975). A Practical Course of English Pronunciation: A Perceptual Approach. London: Arnold
- Gimson, A.C (ed.) (1977). English Pronouncing Dictionary. London: Dent
