= Visitor center =

Location providing tourists information

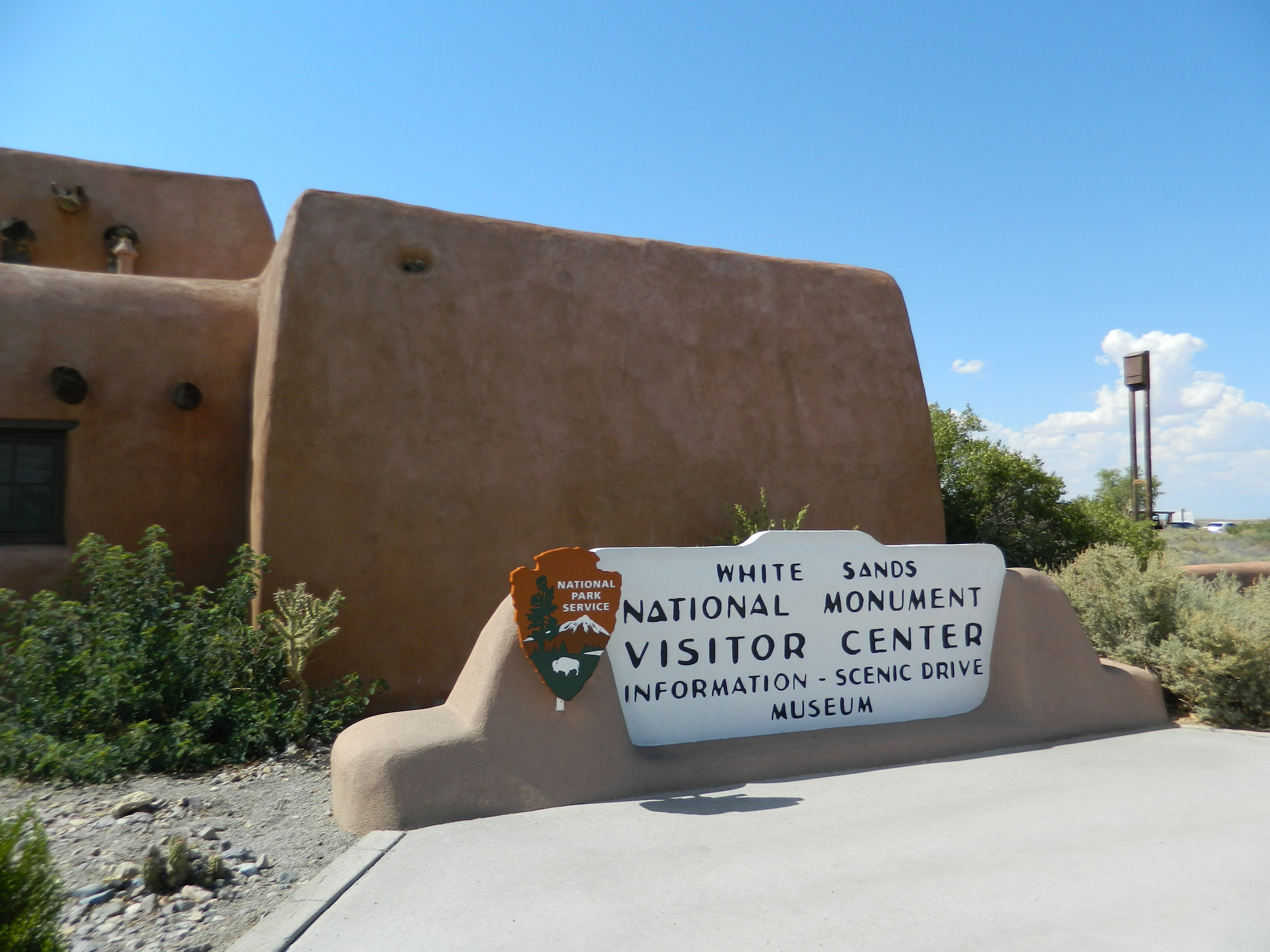
The Visitor center of White Sands national Park (USA)

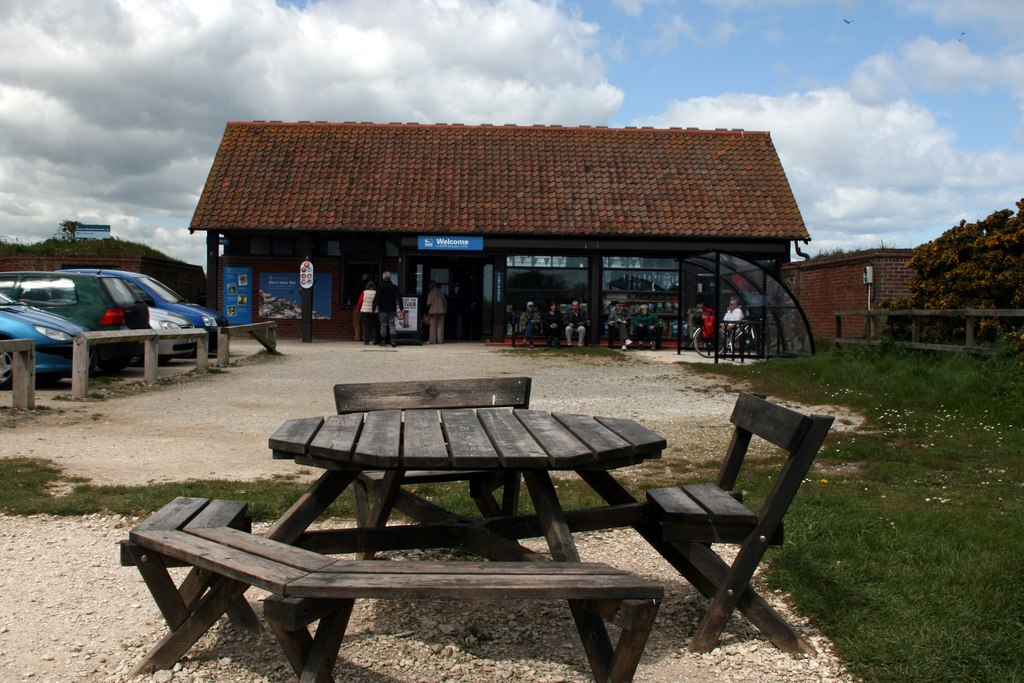
Visitor center at the Bempton Cliffs nature reserve in England

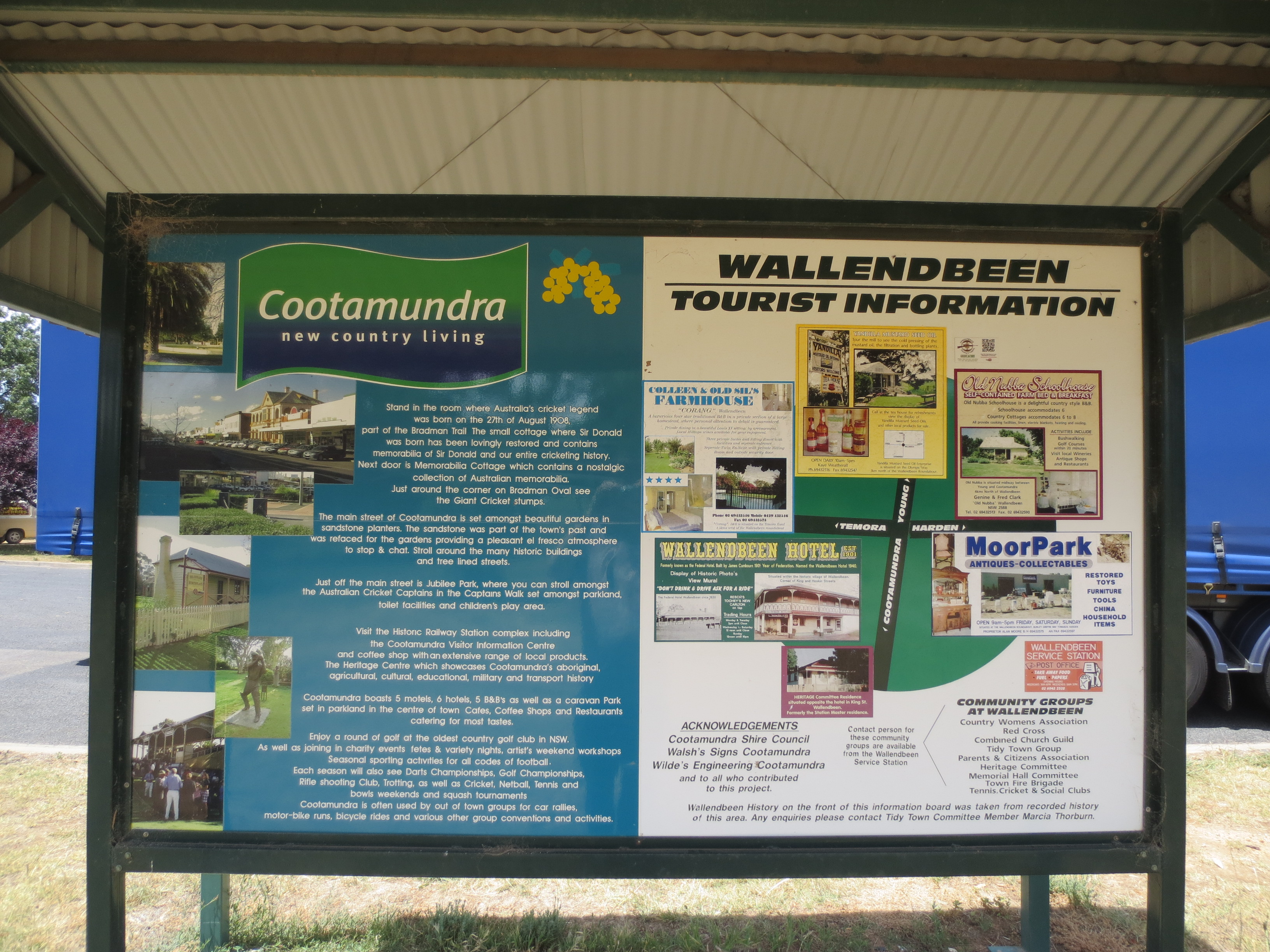
The simplest form of visitor center is an information board, such as this one in Wallendbeen, Australia

A visitor center, visitor information center or tourist information center is a physical location that provides information to tourists.

== Types ==
A visitor center may be a civic center at a specific attraction or place of interest, such as a landmark, national park, national forest, or state park, providing information (such as trail maps, and about camp sites, staff contact, restrooms, etc.) and in-depth educational exhibits and artifact displays (for example, about natural or cultural history). Often a film or other media display is used. If the site has permit requirements or guided tours, the visitor center is often the place where these are coordinated.

A tourist information center provides visitors with information on the area's attractions, lodgings, maps, and other items relevant to tourism. These are often operated at the airport or other port of entry, by the local government or chamber of commerce. Some are called information centers.

== Signage ==
ℹo

Information source
- In Unicode: U+2139 ℹ INFORMATION SOURCE

Tourist information point (UK)

Information (Germany)

Symbol used in Australia by Accredited Visitor Information Centres

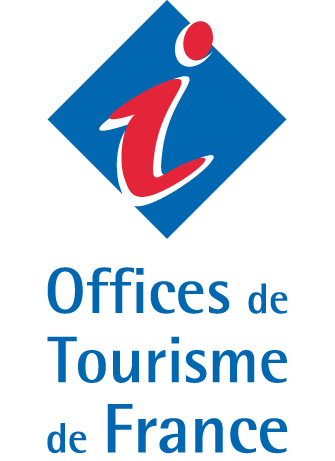
Tourist office in France

The Unicode code block Letterlike Symbols allocates a code point (U+2139) for a symbol that may used to identify an information source. The default form is a lower case, roman type, serif, extra bold, letter i, but the script typeface form $i$ is common.

== Europe ==
=== United Kingdom ===
In the United Kingdom, there is a nationwide network of Tourist Information Centres run by the British Tourist Authority (BTA), represented online by the VisitBritain website and public relations organization. Other TICs are run by local authorities or through private organizations such as local shops in association with BTA.

In England, VisitEngland promotes domestic tourism.

In Wales, the Welsh Government supports TICs through Visit Wales.

In Scotland, the Scottish Government supports VisitScotland, the official tourist organization of Scotland, which also operates Tourist Information Centres across Scotland.

=== Poland ===
In Poland there are special offices and tables giving free information about tourist attractions. Offices are situated in interesting places in popular tourists' destinations and tables usually stay near monuments and important culture

== North America ==
In North America, a welcome center is a rest area with a visitor center, located after the entrance from one state or province to another state or province or in some cases another country, usually along an Interstate Highway or other freeway. These information centers are operated by the state they are located in. The first example opened on 4 May 1935, next to US 12 in New Buffalo, Michigan, near the Indiana state line.

Many United States cities, such as Houston, Texas and Boca Raton, Florida, as well as counties and other areas smaller than states, also operate welcome centers, though usually with less facilities than state centers have.

In Ontario, there are nine Ontario Travel Information Centres located along 400-series highways.

== South America ==
=== Peru ===
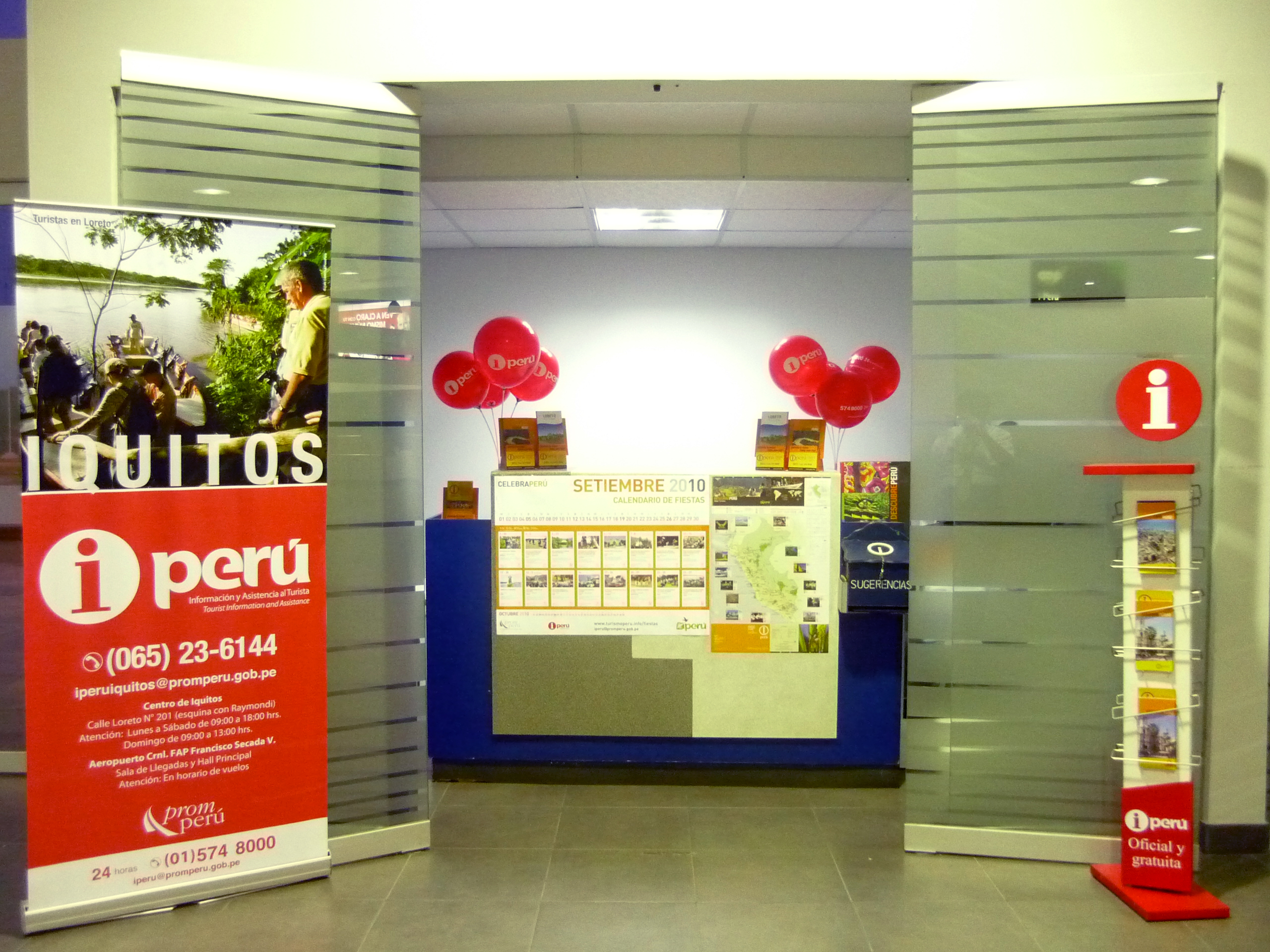
Iperú, the national Peruvian tourist information and assistance center. This office is located inside the Arrival Lounge of the Crnl. FAP Francisco Secada Vignetta International Airport, in Iquitos, Peruvian Amazonia.

Peru features Iperú, Tourist Information and Assistance, a free service that provides tourist information for domestic and foreign travelers, the information covers destinations, attractions, recommended routes and licensed tourism companies in Peru. It also provides assistance on various procedures or where tourists have problems of various kinds. Iperú receives complaints and suggestions for destinations and tourism companies operating in Peru (lodging, travel agencies, airlines, buses, etc.).

Iperú, Tourist Information and Assistance has a nationwide network represented online by the Peru.travel website, the 24/7 line (51 1) 5748000, and 31 local offices in 13 regions in all over Peru: Lima-Callao, Amazonas, Piura, Lambayeque, La Libertad, Ancash, Arequipa, Tacna, Puno, Ayacucho, Cusco, Tumbes and Iquitos.

The official tourist organization or national tourist board of Peru is PromPerú, a national organization that promotes both tourism and international commerce of this country worldwide.

== Oceania ==
In Australia, most visitor centers are local or state government-run, or in some cases as an association of tourism operators on behalf of the government, usually managed by a board or executive. Those that comply with a national accreditation programme use the italic $i$ as pictured. These visitor information centers (often abbreviated as VICs) provide information on the local area, and usually perform services such as accommodation and tour bookings, flight/bus/train/hire car options, and act as the first point of contact a visitor has with the town or region.

== Gallery ==
Visitor centres around the world
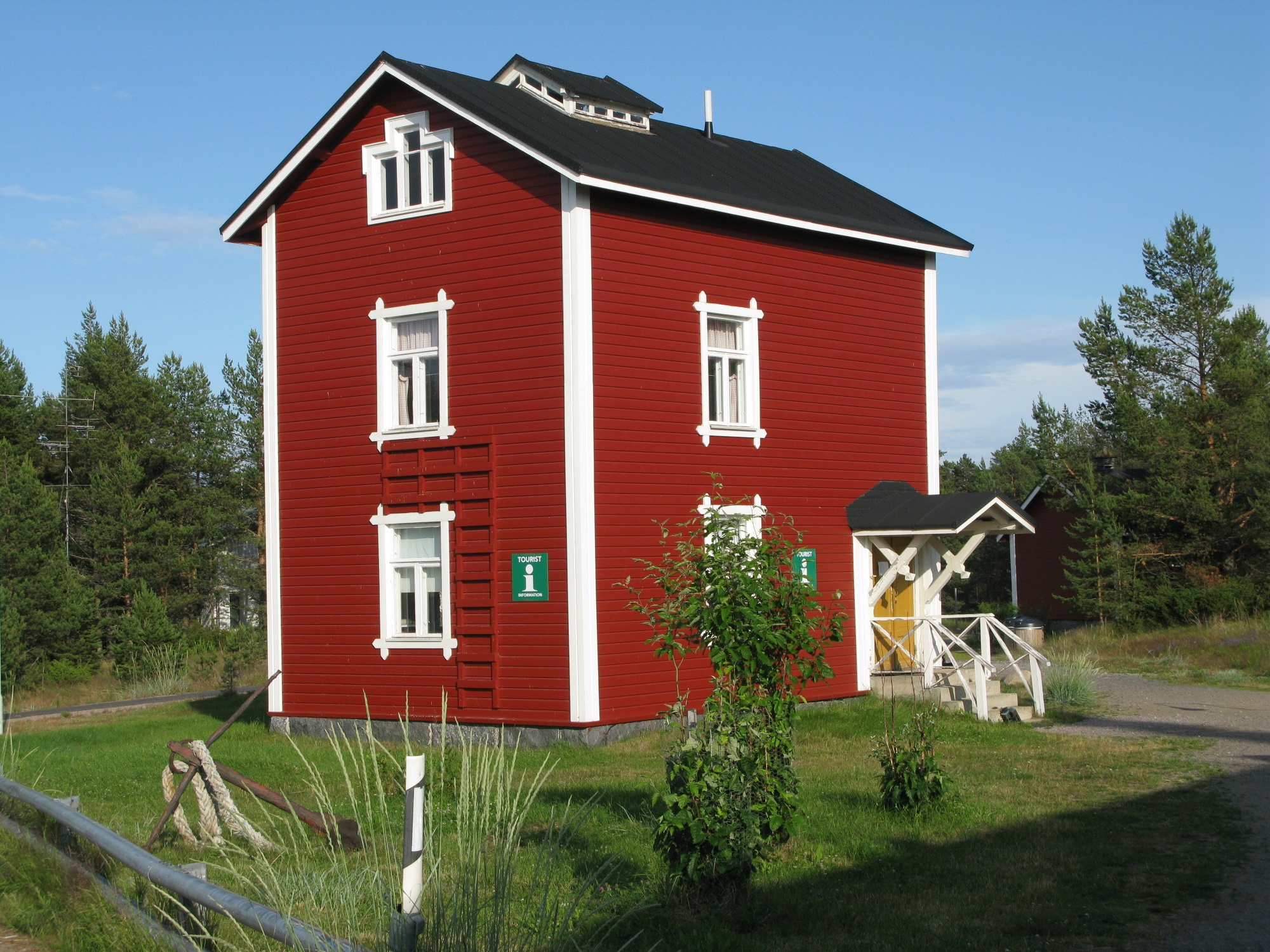
A tourist info office of the Hailuoto Island in North Ostrobothnia, Finland

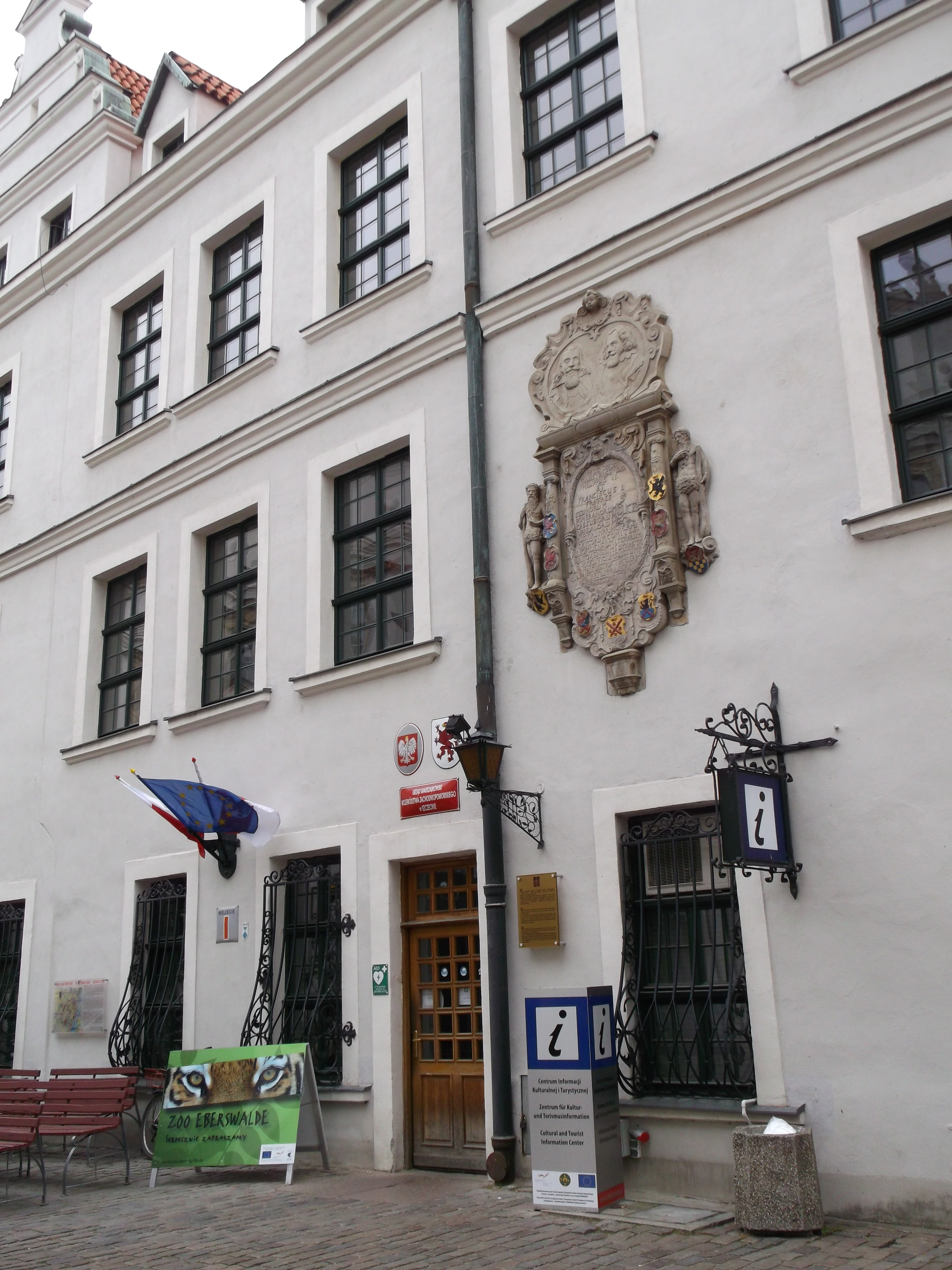
Cultural and Tourist Information Center in Ducal Castle, Szczecin, Poland

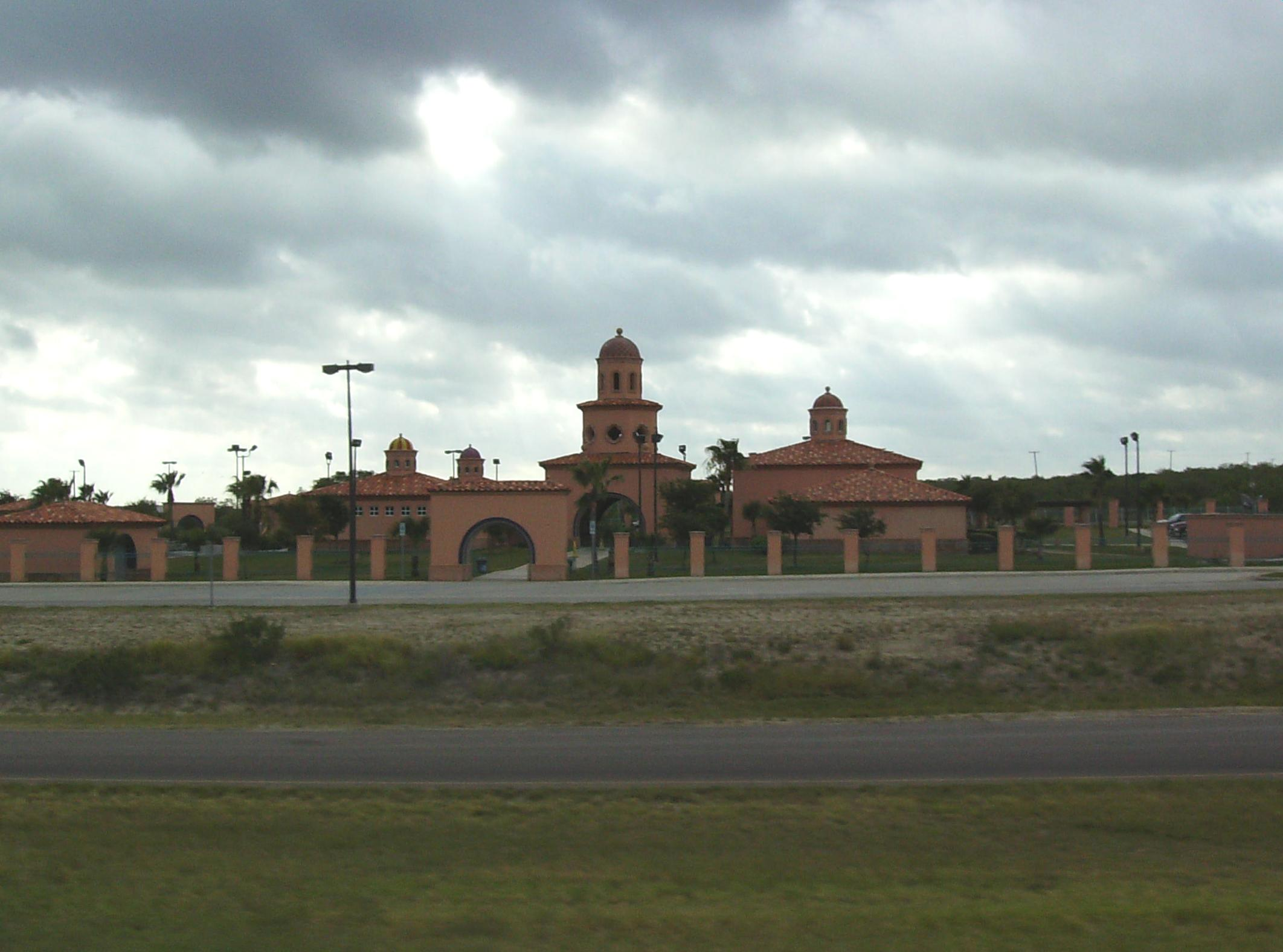
Texas Travel Information Center located near Laredo, Texas along I-35, 18 miles from the Mexico – United States border.

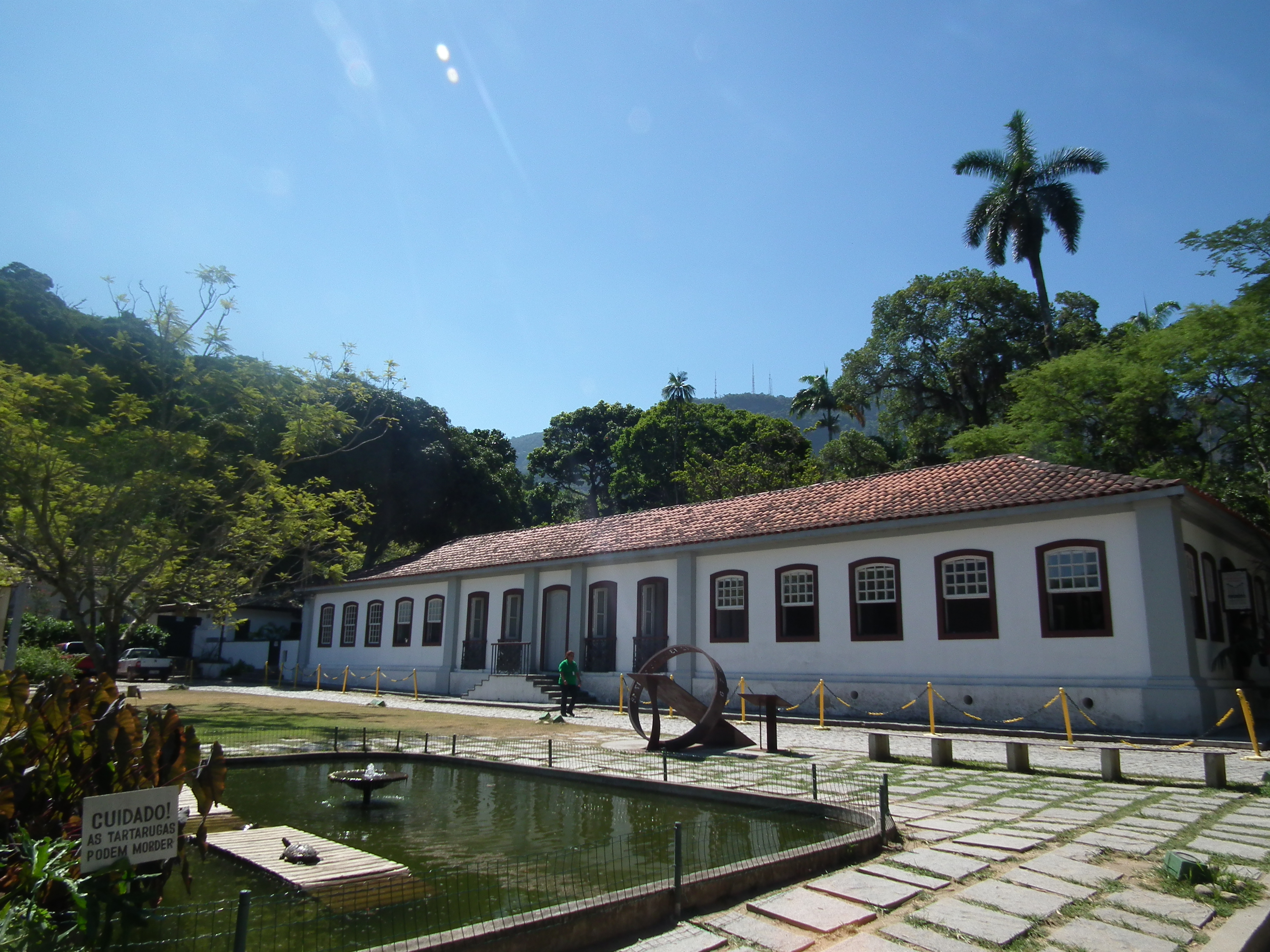
Visitor center of the Rio de Janeiro Botanical Garden, Brazil.

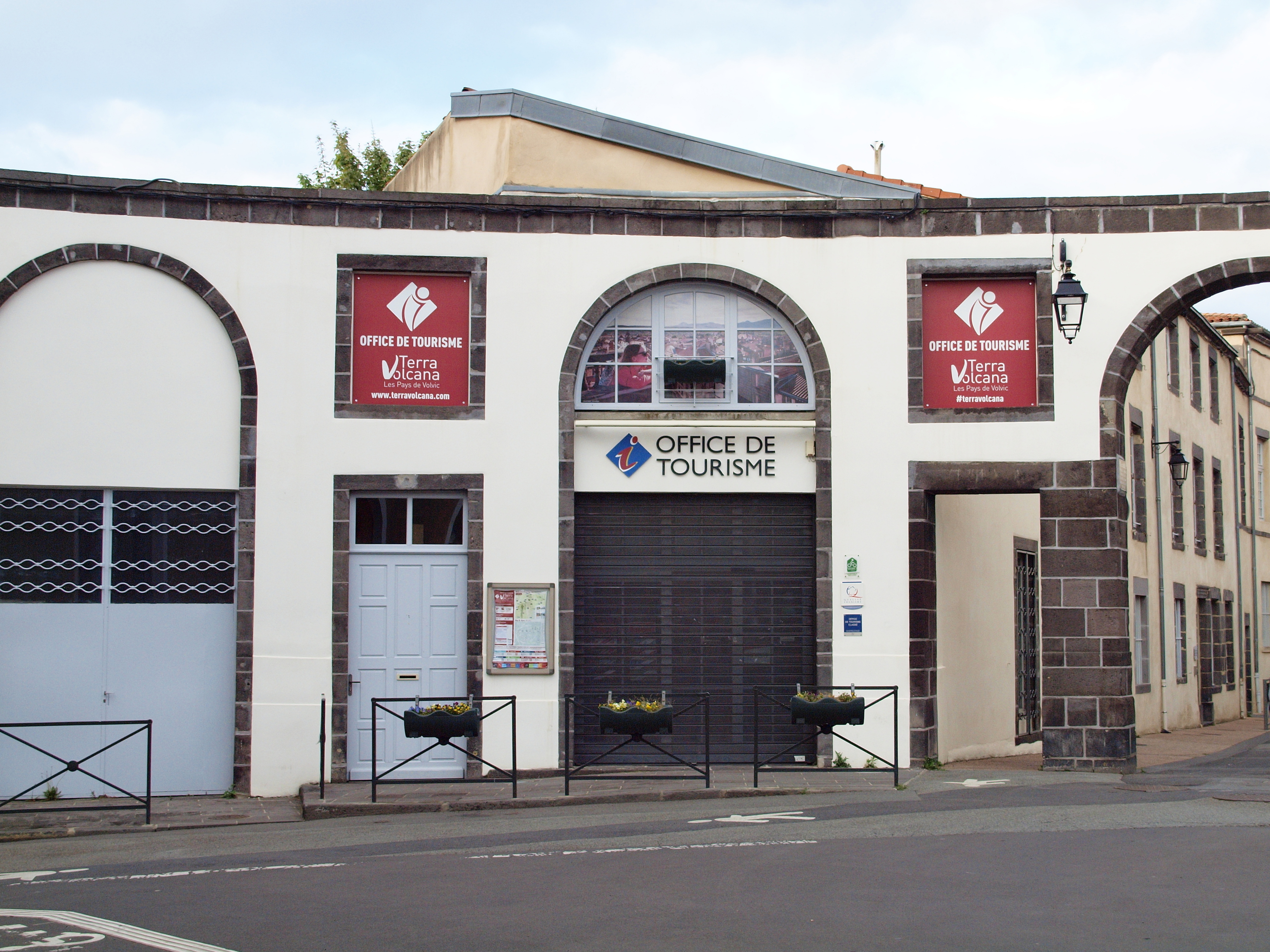
The tourist office of Riom, France

== See also ==
- Heritage center
- Heritage interpretation
- Interpretation center
- Nature center
- United States Capitol Visitor Center
