= The Gathering Ireland 2013 =

Irish government tourism initiative

- Native name: Tóstal Éireann 2013
- Date: 2013 (year-long)
- Location: Republic of Ireland (nationwide)
- Type: Tourism initiative, cultural festival
- Budget: €5 million (initial allocation)
- Participants: Irish diaspora, local communities
- Outcome: Over 5,000 events; increased tourism revenue

The Gathering Ireland 2013, referred to as The Gathering, was a tourism-led initiative in Ireland. It aimed to mobilise the Irish diaspora to return to Ireland during 2013 to be part of specially organised local gatherings and events during the year. It was a government supported initiative driven primarily by Fáilte Ireland, the National Tourism Development Authority, and Tourism Ireland. The concept relied on grassroots initiatives of private individuals, and non-governmental organisations. The Gathering was not a single event but provided an umbrella framework for varying activities throughout 2013, from family reunions and clan gatherings to sports fixtures. While the initiative was primarily directed at the Irish diaspora, and those with other links to the country, the organisers hoped the experience for the general tourist would also be enhanced.

It began on 1 January 2013 and ended on 31 December 2013.

== Background ==
The concept for The Gathering Ireland 2013 first emerged at the 2009 Global Irish Economic Forum held in Farmleigh, Dublin. The forum had two broad objectives: to examine ways in which Ireland could develop more strategic relationships with its diaspora; and to provide a platform for those living overseas who claim Irish ancestry to contribute to the country's economic recovery. The Gathering Ireland 2013 was seen as an opportunity to address both of these objectives, the latter achieved through additional overseas visitors and tourism revenue, which in turn may stimulate job creation.

== Criticism ==
The initiative was criticised by entrepreneur Michael O'Leary and actor Gabriel Byrne. In a broad criticism of fiscal policy at a Dublin conference, O'Leary referred to the initiative as "The Grabbing", though he went on to say "We like, actually, the Gathering. I thought it wasn't a bad idea. There's no reason not to welcome everyone back to Ireland". Byrne, who previously served as a cultural ambassador for Ireland, said many Irish emigrants in the US felt abandoned by the government and described the initiative as "a scam", adding that the majority of Irish people "don't give a shit about the diaspora except to shake them down for a few quid".

== See also ==
- Tourism in Ireland
- Homecoming Scotland 2009
- List of tourist attractions in Ireland
