= Malleson =

Malleson is a surname. Notable people with the surname include:

- Lady Constance Malleson (1895-1975), British writer and actress
- George Bruce Malleson (1825–1898), English officer and author
- Joan Malleson (1899-1956), English physician and advocate of the legalisation of abortion
- Miles Malleson (1888–1969), English actor, husband of Lady Constance Malleson and Joan Malleson
- Eric Maleson (born 1967), American/Brazilian Bobsleigh Olympic Athlete
- Tamzin Malleson (born 1974), English actress
- Wilfred St. Aubyn Malleson (1896-1975), midshipman awarded the Victoria Cross
- Wilfrid Malleson (1866–1946), British general

== See also ==
- Malleson mission, a military action of British troops against Bolshevik forces in Transcaspia
- Mallison, surname
- Mallinson, surname
