= Mallison =

Mallison is a surname. Notable people with the surname include:

- Francis A. Mallison (1832–1877), American journalist
- Françoise Mallison (born 1940), French Indologist
- John Mallison (1929–2012), Australian Christian pastor

== See also ==
- Malleson
- Mallinson
