= Tourism in the Republic of Ireland =

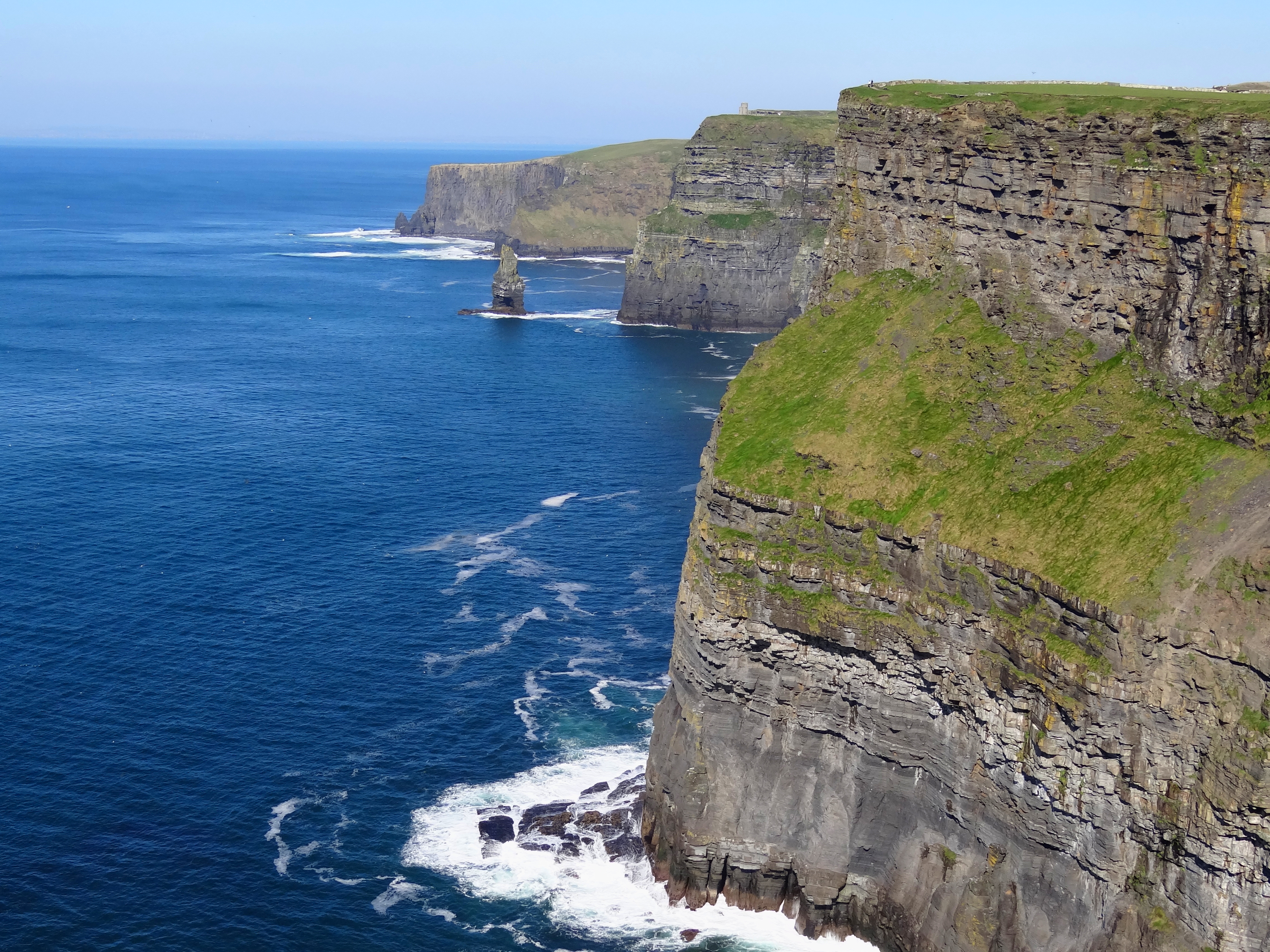
The Cliffs of Moher in County Clare attracts around 1 million visitors each year.

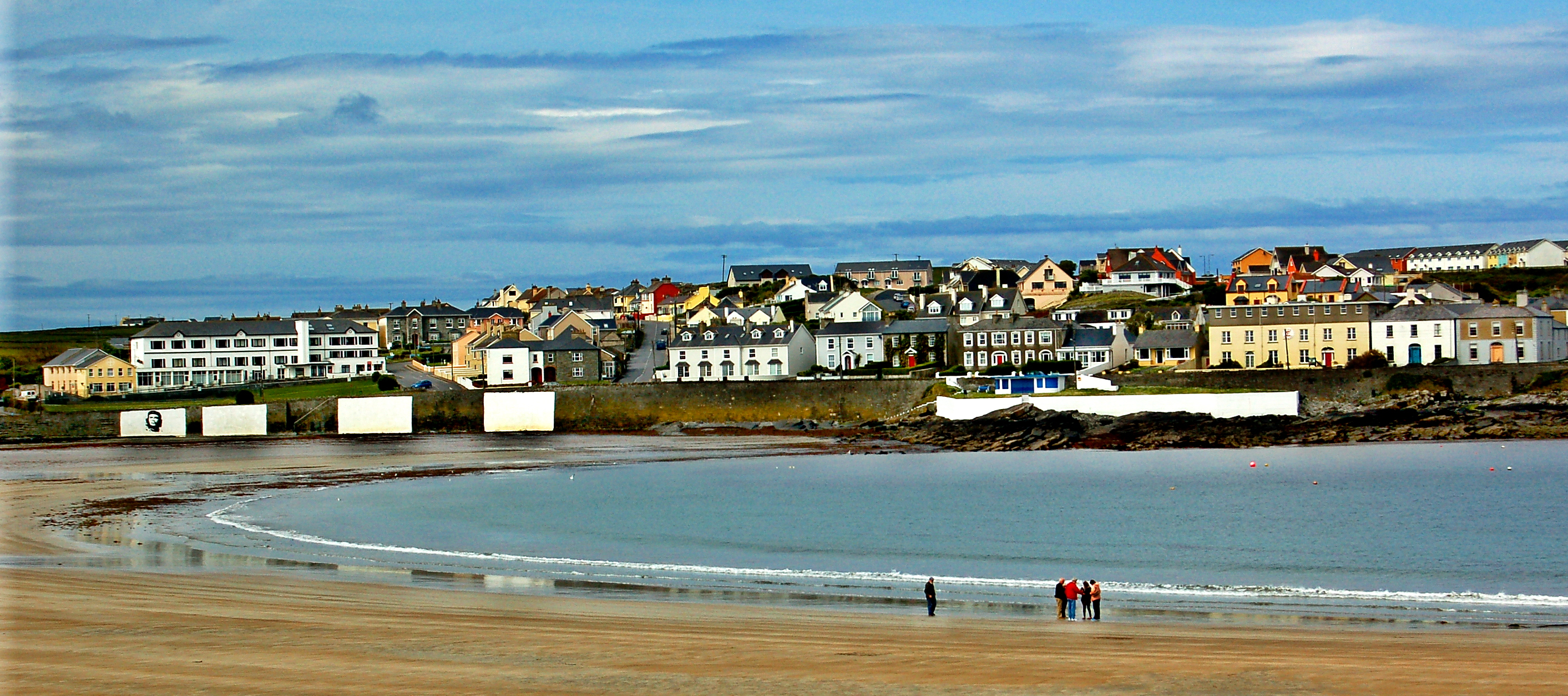
Ireland has many beaches and Seaside resorts such as this one in Kilkee.

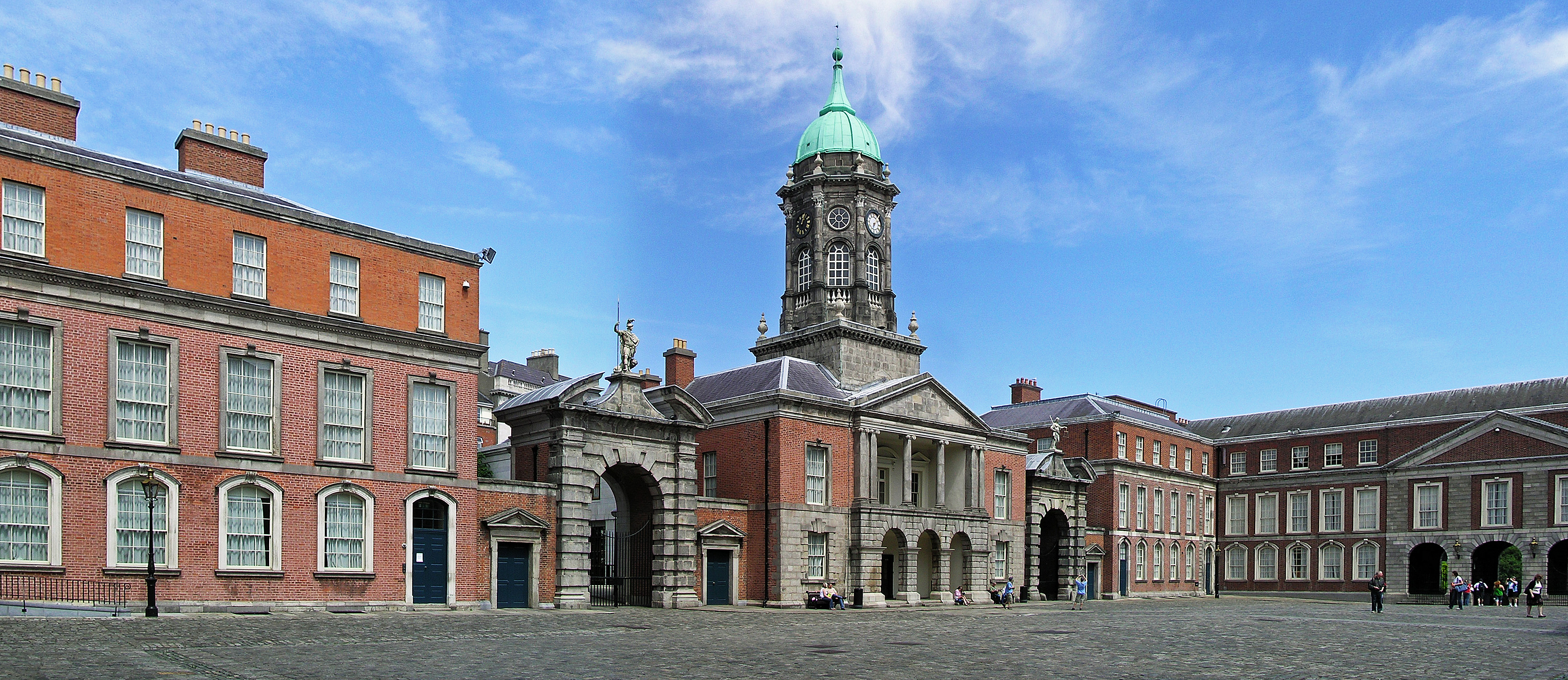
Dublin Castle, the former seat of British rule in Ireland.

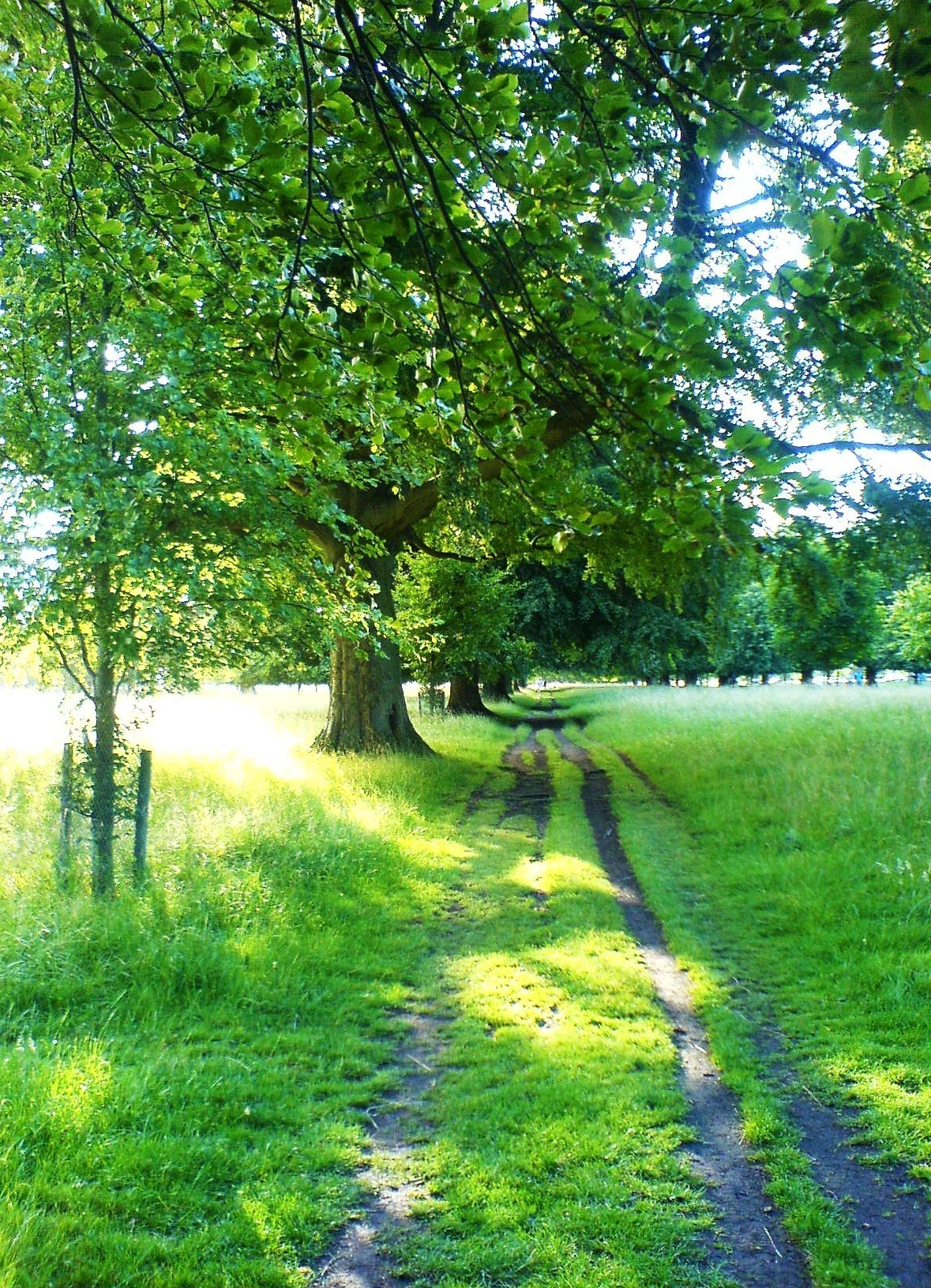
Phoenix Park, the largest inner city park in Europe.

Tourism in the Republic of Ireland is one of the biggest contributors to the economy of Ireland, with 9.0 million people visiting the country in 2017, about 1.8 times Ireland's population. Each year, about €5.2bn in revenue is made from economic activities directly related to tourists, accounting for nearly 2% of GNP and employing over 200,000 people. In 2011 alone, Ireland was voted 'Favourite holiday destination in the World' by readers of Frommer's Guide, Lonely Planet listed Ireland as the world's friendliest country and Cork City as one of the top ten cities in the world and the Irish tourist boards website, DiscoverIreland.com, was named the best tourist board website in the world. In 2021, Ireland was the "13th most popular tourist destination in the world", with 11 million visitors, according to the UN World Tourism Organisation. Most tourists visiting Ireland come from the United Kingdom, the United States, Germany, and France.

== History ==
In 1764, an English man named John Bush travelled to Ireland and wrote an account of his experience, giving impressions of the famous sights he saw as well as useful information to visitors who might come after him, regarding the sourcing of good-quality accommodation etc.:

Every stranger, therefore, that proposes making any stay in Dublin, if it be but for a fortnight, I would advise to have immediate recourse to the public coffee-houses, of which he will find several in Essex-Street by the Custom-house, and there get directions to the private inhabitants of the town who furnish lodgings...

By the late 19th century, guidebooks to Ireland were still being produced by and for the British market (at least), to which Ireland still belonged. In the introduction to "Ireland (Part I)", published in 1890 as part of the Thorough Guides series, the editors remarked that:

Ireland contains a number of tourist districts, not difficult to comprehend in one or two tours, but geographically detached and distinct in their kinds of scenery. The country may be likened to an oval dish, the rim of which represents the mountainous and rocky seaboard, and the centre the inland plain. The plain is in parts rough and broken, but hardly anywhere can it be said to rise to the character of first-class scenery.

== Transport in Ireland ==
Ireland's national flag carrier is Aer Lingus, which services Europe, North America and North Africa, but the vast majority of flights originating from continental Europe come from another Irish company, Ryanair, the biggest low-cost airline in the world. These airlines, along with others, fly into all three of Ireland's international airports, Shannon Airport, Dublin Airport and Cork Airport. Dublin Airport is by far the busiest, accounting for over 80% of passengers entering and leaving Ireland in 2011. Along with these airports there are several other regional airports in the country including Ireland West Airport and Kerry Airport, which both operate international flights to Europe.

For travellers from mainland Europe and the UK, another way to enter the country is by sea, with connections by ferry to Roscoff and Cherbourg in France, Liverpool in England and Pembroke, Fishguard and Holyhead in Wales, Douglas on the Isle of Man and Santander in Spain. These routes are operated by Irish Ferries, Stena Line, P&O Ferries and Brittany Ferries.

Motorways link Dublin with all the major cities in the country and there are plans to extend the motorway system in the future. In recent years the quality of Irish roads has improved dramatically with the advent of the Celtic Tiger and significant European Union funding, although outside the main routes, roads can be quite unpredictable in terms of quality and upkeep, especially in rural areas such as County Kerry and County Donegal.

The rail and light rail network in Ireland is not as extensive as it once was, but it is still possible to get from city to city using the rail system, although many rural stations have closed along these lines. At the moment there is only one Light rail system in the country, the Luas in Dublin. This system opened in 2004 and due to the number of people availing of it (27.5million in 2010), it was stated as being "Dublin's best public transport success story" by Minister for Transport, Tourism and Sport, Leo Varadkar in 2011.

== SailRail ==
Transport for Wales Rail, Iarnród Éireann, as well as Irish Ferries and Stena Line promote SailRail

SailRail tickets offer a discounted means of travelling from anywhere on the UK rail network to anywhere on the Irish rail network with one ticket. A bus connection from Dublin Port is required to reach Dublin's main train stations, Connolly or Heuston.

== Cities ==
=== Dublin ===
The largest city in Ireland is Dublin. Due to its proximity to Britain, it was the most important city in Ireland during the Tudor conquest of Ireland and subsequent British Invasions until after 1922 when the Irish Free State was formed. As the British held a presence here for over 500 years, most of the historic buildings from the 1500s on were built by them. As Dublin Airport is located just outside the city, most international visitors to Ireland begin their stay here. Among the main attractions in Dublin are Dublin Castle, the seat of British rule in Ireland until 1922, Phoenix Park, one of the largest inner-city parks in the world, The General Post Office, one of Ireland's most famous buildings due to the 1916 Easter rising, Kilmainham Gaol, a former prison turned museum that held and executed the rebels of the 1916 Rising and Trinity College, where the Book of Kells and the Book of Durrow are held. In 2010, Dublin was awarded the title of UNESCO City of Literature, as many famous writers such as Jonathan Swift, Oscar Wilde, W. B. Yeats, James Joyce, George Bernard Shaw and Samuel Beckett are from the city.

Other attractions

- Guinness Brewery, a brewery founded in 1759 that produces Guinness. As of 2018, it was most-visited fee-charging tourist attraction in Ireland.
- Bloomsday, a festival of celebration into James Joyce's life, during which the events of his novel Ulysses are relived. It is held annually in Dublin on 16 June.
- The Ha'penny Bridge, a famous Victorian bridge spanning the River Liffey.
- Croke Park, one of Europe's biggest stadiums and principal stadium of the Gaelic Athletic Association (GAA).
- Temple Bar, an area on the south side of the city that has preserved its medieval street pattern, with many narrow cobbled streets. It is now known for its nightlife.
- St Stephen's Green, a city centre public park.
- The buildings of Georgian Dublin, e.g. the Customs House and the houses at Fitzwilliam Square and Merrion Square, Mountjoy Square, Parnell Square, and Henrietta Street (one of the buildings in Henrietta Street is now a museum showcasing the history of that particular Georgian building).
- Samuel Beckett Bridge, a recent, 21st century (Celtic Tiger) landmark in the Docklands.
- The "Millennium Spire" or Spire of Dublin, a recent, 21st century landmark on O'Connell Street.
- The General Post Office, a late Georgian building on O'Connell Street that served as the headquarters of the leaders of the 1916 Easter Rising (now partially a museum about said Rising).
- St. Patrick's Cathedral, a 12-th century cathedral serving as the national cathedral of the Church of Ireland, largely rebuilt in the 19th century.
- Christ Church Cathedral, an 11-th century cathedral, the cathedral of the United Dioceses of Dublin and Glendalough and the cathedral of the ecclesiastical province of the United Provinces of Dublin and Cashel in the (Anglican) Church of Ireland, largely rebuilt in the 19th century.

=== Cork ===
Situated on the southern coast of Ireland, Cork is the second biggest city in the country. Due to a population explosion in the 19th century, many of its public buildings are from this era. In this period two cathedrals were built, the Cathedral of St Mary and St Anne and Saint Fin Barre's Cathedral. Another historic attraction from this time is Cork City Gaol which opened in 1824 and was redeveloped as a visitor centre in the 1990s. Cork's best known building and a symbol of the city, the Church of St. Anne in Shandon, is known for its clock tower dubbed the "four faced liar" on account of all four of the clocks showing slightly different times. Cork Airport is located just outside the city and connects Cork to several other European cities, although many direct flight routes are only available in the summer. In 2024, Cork was named on National Geographic's 'best of the world' travel list.

Other attractions

- Fota Wildlife Park, a zoo located just outside the city on Fota Island, now one of the most popular visitor attractions in the country.
- Elizabeth Fort, a 17th-century star fort just off Barrack Street, originally built as a defensive fortification outside the city walls, it is now a tourist attraction.
- Cork Opera House, an opera house built in the 1850s.
- The English Market, a food market that dates back to 1610. The market draws visitors from throughout the world, including a visit by Queen Elizabeth II during her 2011 state visit in 2011.
- University College Cork, a National University of Ireland, the grounds are popular with visitors due to the fact the River Lee flows through it.
- Blarney Castle, a medieval castle in Blarney, a town just west of Cork. The castle is now a partial ruin with some accessible rooms and battlements and is the location of the Blarney Stone, a stone which is rumoured to give you the gift of eloquence when you kiss it.
- Spike Island, a former prison island located in Cork harbour, just off the coast of Cobh. A 24-acre star-shaped fort was built in the late 1700s and this became the largest prison in the world in the 1850s, during the famine years. The island was converted into a visitor attraction in 2016 and won the title of 'Europe's Leading Tourist Attraction in 2017.

=== Limerick ===
Situated on the mouth of the River Shannon, Limerick has been an important gateway city for over 800 years. Due to the city's location on the midpoint of the Atlantic Corridor, nearness to Shannon Airport (12 Miles) and good supply of reasonably priced hotels it has become something of a base city for tourists travelling along the west coast of Ireland, although the city has many attractions in its own right. King John's Castle in the medieval quarter of the city is arguably the best-known attraction in the city, dating back to 922AD. The old city walls of Limerick surround a small bit of the site, although most of the walls have collapsed. St Mary's cathedral also in the medieval quarter is a must see. It is a completely restored 12th-century cathedral with views over the city. The Hunt Museum in the city hosts one of the world's greatest private collections in the world, winning the Museum of the year award many times over the years. The museum has a wide collection of both ancient and medieval pieces of art and sculpture, originating from varied locations and civilisations around the world including Ancient Greece, Ancient Rome, Ancient Egypt and the Olmec Civilisation. Artists' works in the museum include Pablo Picasso, Pierre-Auguste Renoir, Jack B. Yeats and Henry Moore.

Other attractions

- Foynes village and Museum, a small village outside Limerick City that was the last port of call for Seaplanes heading towards The Americas. This stretch of the River Shannon became one of the biggest civilian airports in Europe during World War II, and was where the drink Irish Coffee was first served.
- St John's Cathedral, one of two cathedrals in the city, this one has been in continuous use since 1861 and its spire is the tallest in the country, topping out at 94m. Built in a Gothic Revival style, it is one of the few Irish buildings designed by Philip Charles Hardwick.
- Adare, a tourist destination and heritage centre, many of the buildings in this village still bear their original thatched roofs or crafted stone exteriors.
- Lough Gur, one of Ireland's most important archaeological sites, humans have lived at Lough Gur since about 3000BC and there are several megalithic remains there.

=== Galway ===
Achieving city status in 1484, Galway celebrated its quincentenary in 1984. Galway in itself is not particularly known for its attractions, but rather for its lively atmosphere and entertainment scene. This is partly because 25% of the population of Galway (75,529 in 2011) is made up of students primarily from NUI Galway and GMIT, two third-level institutes in the city. Galway is particularly popular with American tourists as Galway is said to be the most 'Irish' of Ireland's cities, and is one of the few urban areas where you are likely to hear Irish spoken, due to the fact the Gaeltacht area of Connemara is only a few kilometres away. The biggest lake in the country, Lough Corrib, is situated north of the city.

The ferry to the Aran Islands is located about 40 minutes away and departs from the village of Rossaveal regularly. The Aran Islands are located in Galway Bay, and the Irish Language is by far the most used language on the islands, with the vast majority using the language regularly. As the islands are quite a bit from the mainland, cars are quite rare and the main form of transport is the bicycle.

=== Waterford ===
Waterford is a city in the South-East region of Ireland. It is the smallest city in the country, with a population of just over 53,504 in 2016, although it is the oldest, being founded by Vikings in 324AD. Situated in the southeast, the city has one of the warmest climates in Ireland, getting on average an extra hour of sunshine each day. The seaside town of Tramore is located just south of the city and has 5 km long beach, and is also a surfing spot.

== Coastlines and resorts ==
As the Republic of Ireland occupies just over 80% of the island of Ireland, the country has become famous for its scenic coastline and villages and towns by the shoreline. The most widely known of these are situated in the west of Ireland, mostly in Munster, but other areas of the country have their own individual resorts as well. The Cliffs of Moher are the most famous cliffs in Ireland, but the highest cliffs in Ireland are the Croaghaun, on the Atlantic coast of Achill Island off County Mayo, which rise to 688 m, over three times higher than the Cliffs of Moher. The Slieve League cliffs in County Donegal are often incorrectly stated as being the highest, but at only 601m, they come in second.

The south and south west of Ireland is particularly known for its seaside resorts including Kilkee, Lahinch, Quilty, Spanish Point and Doonbeg in County Clare; Youghal, Ballycotton, Kinsale and Bantry in County Cork and Glenbeigh, Dingle, Castlegregory and Ballybunion in County Kerry. As the west of the country faces the stormy Atlantic, it has become synonymous with surfing, particularly in counties Donegal, Sligo and Clare.

== Tourism routes and regions ==
A number of tourist trails and regions were developed in the 2010s to market Ireland as a tourist destination.

=== Wild Atlantic Way ===
A tourism driving route, the Wild Atlantic Way, extends for 2,500 km of roadway along the West coast.

=== Ireland's Ancient East ===
Ireland's Ancient East (Irish: Sean-Oirthear na hÉireann) is a touring region encompassing 17 counties on the eastern side of Ireland. It is divided into three "zones", and is built around four "pillars": Ancient Ireland, Early Christian Ireland, Medieval Ireland and Anglo Ireland.

=== Ireland's Hidden Heartlands ===
Ireland's Hidden Heartlands is a touring region encompassing the Shannon region and Beara-Breifne Way. It was launched in July 2018. Unlike the Wild Atlantic Way, the touring region doesn't have a set driving route, and instead highlights various sights throughout counties Westmeath, Offaly, Roscommon, Longford, Cavan, Leitrim, and parts of Tipperary, Clare and Galway.

=== Reeks District ===
The Reeks District is a tourism region in County Kerry which was created as a destination marketing concept in 2018, having previously being promoted as the "Mid-Kerry region". Taking its name from the MacGillycuddy Reeks, the area was voted as one of the "top 6 to visit" globally by Rough Guides in 2019.

== Festivals and events ==
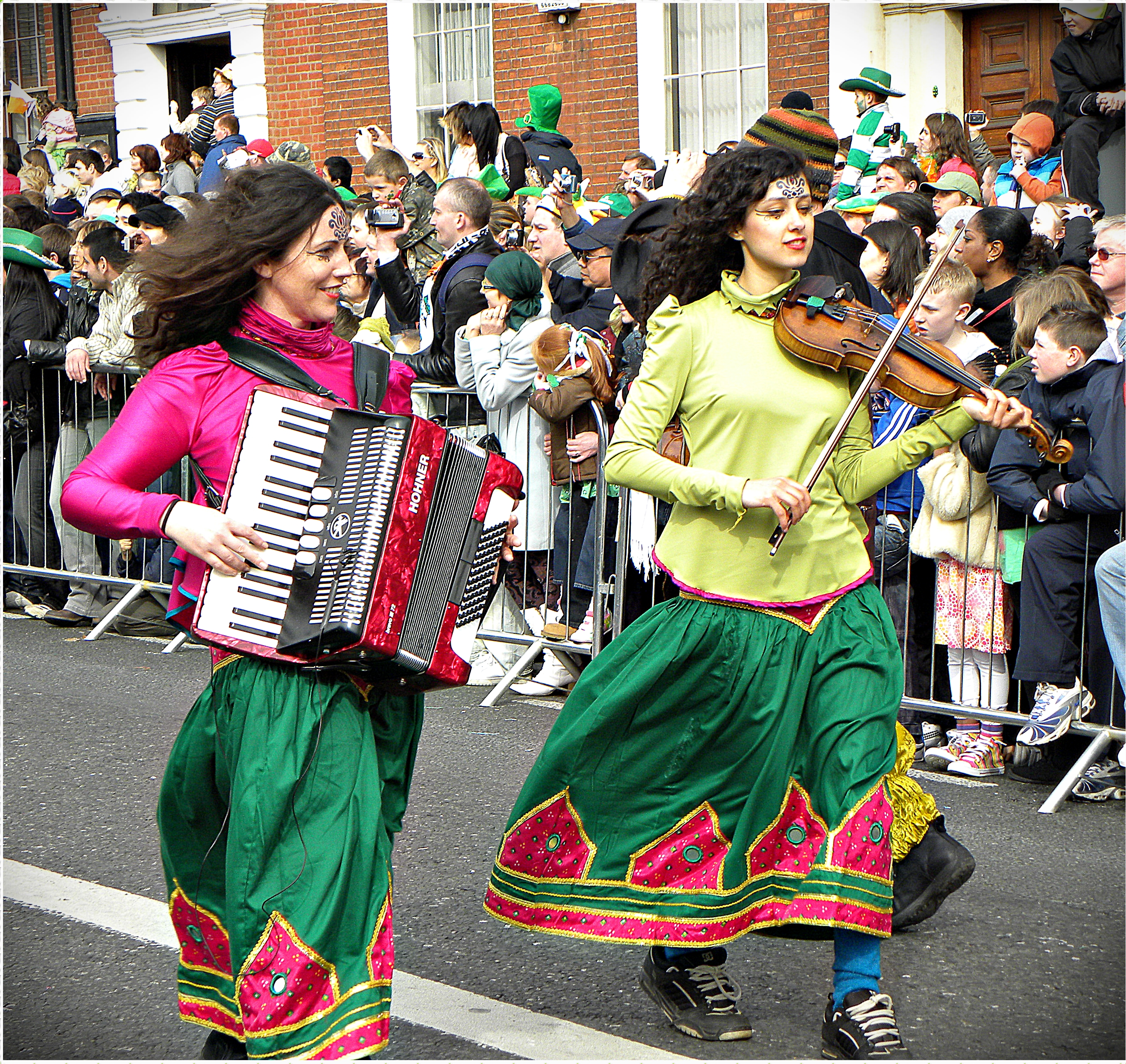
Women playing violin in the Dublin St. Patrick's Day Parade

Ireland has many festivals, most of which take place annually. The most famous by far is the St Patrick's Festival which takes place in every county all over Ireland and celebrates Irish culture the world over. Although St. Patrick's Day festivals are held all over the world on 17 March, the festival in Ireland lasts over a week, and includes the parades on the 17 as well as the Skyfest celebrations, a fireworks display held somewhere different in Ireland every year. Part of the celebrations include Seachtain na Gaeilge (Irish Week), which aims to promote the Irish language during the two weeks proceeding the festival. The parade in Dublin is the focal point of the festival, with over 500,000 people attending it in 2012.

For Irish people, probably the most celebrated sporting events are the annual finals of the All-Ireland Senior Hurling Championship and the All-Ireland Senior Football Championship. These matches, normally held around the middle of September, are normally fully sold out, with well over 80,000 people packed into Croke Park, the largest stadium in Europe not used primarily for Soccer.

Another festival that celebrates the Irish Culture and Diaspora all over the world is the Rose of Tralee. This international competition, which is celebrated among the Irish communities all over the world, is held annually in the town of Tralee in County Kerry. The winner is picked based on her personality and her ability to be a good role model for the festival and for Ireland during her travels around the world. Unlike other pageants, the competitors are not judged on their appearance or their body. One of the only rules of the competition is that the potential roses have to have an Irish ancestry.

The Galway Races is an Irish horse-racing festival that starts on the last Monday of July every year. Traditionally the busiest days of the races are the Thursday, when the Galway Hurdle and ladies' day take place. It is famous throughout the world for being one of the world's biggest race meetings. It is estimated that over the week-long festival, 150,000 people attend the event.

The Galway International Oyster Festival is held in the City of Galway. It has won a number of awards and titles including 'one of the 12 greatest shows on earth' by the Sunday Times, and was listed in the AA Travel Guide as one of Europe's Seven Best Festivals, on par with the Munich Beer Festival.

Electric Picnic is another popular music festival held in Stradbally Hall in Stradbally, County Laois every year since 2004. It was voted Best Medium-Sized European Festival at the 2010 European Festival Awards, and has been voted Best Big Festival at each of the last four Irish Festival Awards since they began in 2007. Compared to other major music festivals, there is more emphasis on quality festival services such as food and sleeping arrangements. Rolling Stone Magazine stated it was one of the best festivals they had ever been to.

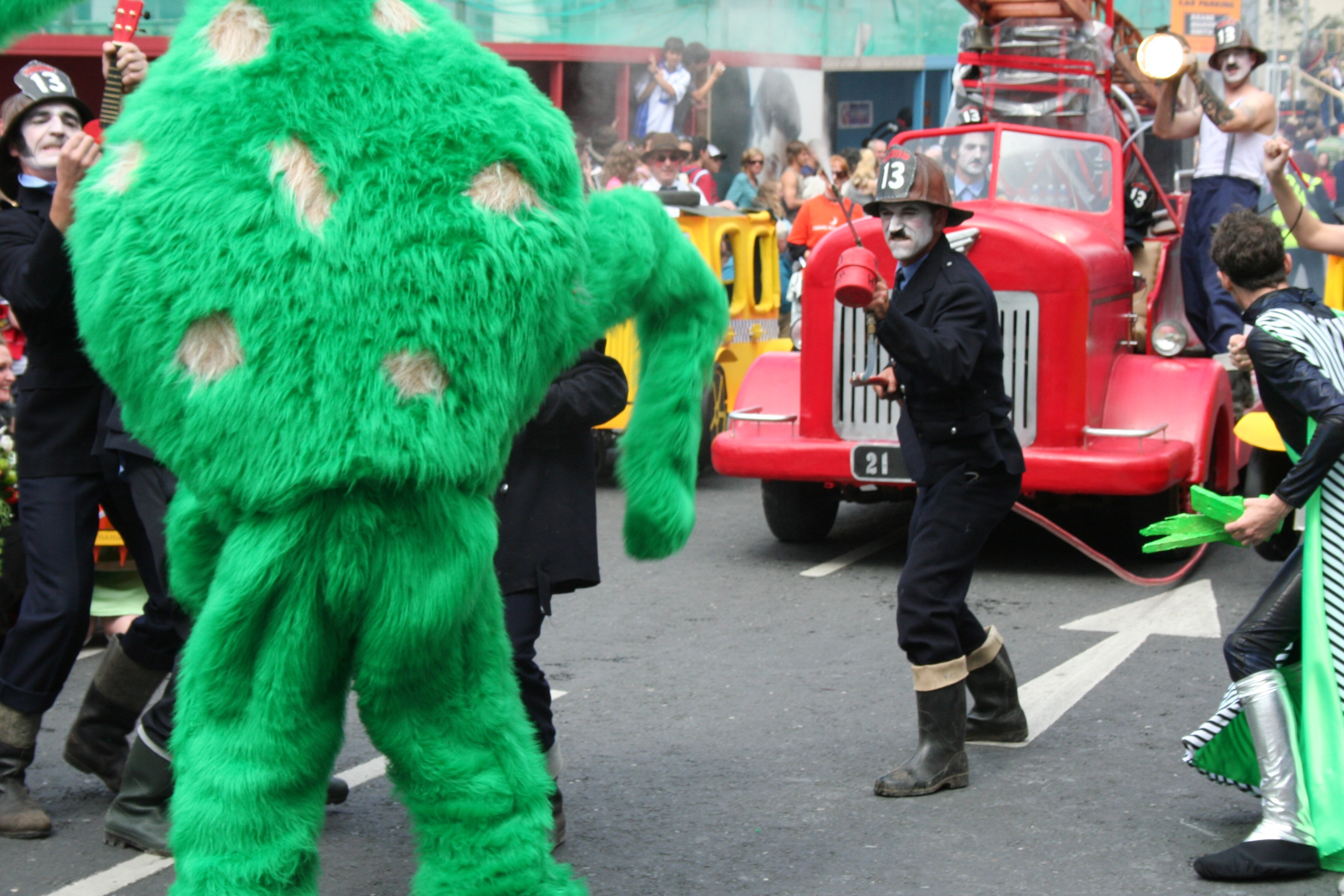
The Galway Arts Festival

The Lisdoonvarna Matchmaking Festival is one of the oldest festivals in the country, originally started in 1892. Held over the month of September every year, the festival attracts between 20,000 and 40,000 romantic hopefuls, coming from all over the world to take part in the events. Willie Daly, the prime matchmaker, uses his notebook of love-seeking profiles to match potential couples, and the festival has evolved to become the biggest matchmaking festival in Europe.

The Galway Arts Festival is an annual arts festival that takes place each July in Galway City. It is an international celebration of the performing and visual arts and an important showcase for the Irish arts. Every year around 150,000 people attend the event annually. Founded in 1978, the festival continues to grow as a major attraction for national and international visitors

== Geological tourism ==
Ireland has many geological attractions, most being along the coastline of the country. The two most famous geologically important destinations in the Republic are both situated in County Clare; the Cliffs of Moher and The Burren. Another notable geological phenomena, the Giant's Causeway, lies in Northern Ireland. The Cliffs of Moher are one of the most visited sites in the country, with the rocks at the bottom of the cliffs dated as being about 320 million years old, formed when Ireland was under water during the Carboniferous Period. The Burren was also created during this period. When a tropical sea flooded the south of the country, a buildup of coral (Limestone) began, covering many places in Ireland. When the sea shallowed, rocks such as Sandstone and Shale were deposited over the Limestone, effectively covering it over again. The Burren is one of the largest karst landscapes in Europe and is one of the few places in the country where the limestone is visible above ground.

Many Irish mountains are also of geological distinction, most of them being formed in the Caledonian or Amorican era. These mountains, formed between 400 and 250 million years ago, would have been the same height as the Alps, but due to weathering, have become much smaller over time.

== Statistics ==
Tourist arrivals of 2024 in %

In 2017 9,932,100 overseas tourists visited Ireland, a 3.5% increase over the previous years figure of 9,584,400.

Rank	Country	Visitors
1	United Kingdom	3,728,900
2	United States & Canada	2,101,500
3	Germany	681,400
4	France	549,300
5	Spain	443,200
6	Italy	363,300
7	Australia, New Zealand & Rest of Oceania	208,500
	Rest of Europe	1,445,200
	Rest of World	410,800
	Total	9,932,100

In 2016 9,584,400 overseas tourists visited Ireland, a 9.8% increase over the previous years figure of 8,643,100.

Rank	Country	Visitors
1	United Kingdom	3,924,100
2	United States & Canada	1,808,000
3	Germany	652,200
4	France	531,400
5	Spain	394,900
6	Italy	344,400
7	Australia, New Zealand & Rest of Oceania	204,500
	Rest of Europe	1,379,100
	Rest of World	345,700
	Total	9,584,400

In 2015 8,643,100 overseas tourists visited Ireland, a 13.7% increase over the previous years figure of 7,604,400.

Rank	Country	Visitors
1	United Kingdom	3,546,900
2	United States & Canada	1,514,200
3	Germany	629,300
4	France	504,700
5	Spain	343,200
6	Belgium, Netherlands, & Luxembourg	326,000
7	Italy	321,400
8	Denmark, Finland, Norway & Sweden	233,900
9	Australia, New Zealand & Rest of Oceania	207,600
	Rest of Europe	684,900
	Rest of World	331,000
	Total	8,643,100

In 2014 7,604,400 overseas tourists visited Ireland, an 8.1% increase over the previous years figure of 6,985,900.

Rank	Country	Visitors	Percentage
1	United Kingdom	3,163,900	41.6%
2	United States & Canada	1,328,600	17.5%
3	Germany	455,700	6.0%
4	France	396,000	5.2%
5	Spain	307,900	3.8%
6	Belgium, Netherlands, & Luxembourg	274,700	3.6%
7	Italy	257,800	3.4%
8	Denmark, Finland, Norway & Sweden	200,300	2.6%
9	Australia, New Zealand & Rest of Oceania	190,000	2.5%
	Rest of Europe	601,500	7.9%
	Rest of World	283,800	3.7%
	Total	7,604,400	100%

In 2013 6,985,900 overseas tourists visited Ireland, a 7.2% increase over the previous years figure.

Rank	Country	Visitors	Percentage
1	United Kingdom	2,929,000	42%
2	United States	1,036,000	14.8%
3	Germany	483,000	7%
4	France	434,000	6%
5	Belgium, Netherlands, & Luxembourg	265,000	3.8%
6	Spain	263,000	3.8%
7	Italy	234,000	3.4%
8	Denmark, Finland, Norway & Sweden	210,000	3%
9	Australia, New Zealand & Rest of Oceania	188,000	2.7%
10	Canada	123,000	1.8%
	Rest of Europe	575,000	8.2%
	Rest of World	248,000	3.5%
	Total	6,985,900	100%

Overall visitor numbers showed a downturn between 2024 and 2025.

== Entry regulations ==
Under the Short-stay Waiver Programme, anyone from the countries on the list below can travel to Ireland within the time remaining on a current UK visa, without the requirement to obtain an Irish visa, and be granted permission to stay in Ireland up to a maximum of 90 days, or the time left on their UK visa to expire.

Irish Short-stay Visa Waiver Programme
Bahrain
Belarus
China (Note: In relation to China, nationals of the Special Administrative Regions of Hong Kong and Macau are already on the list of those nationals who do not require a visa to travel to Ireland.)
India
Kazakhstan
Kosovo
Kuwait
Montenegro
Oman
Qatar
Russian Federation
Saudi Arabia
Serbia
Turkey
Ukraine
United Arab Emirates
Uzbekistan

Citizens of most countries can enter Ireland without a visa, or by the Short-stay Visa Waiver Programme, however citizens of the following countries need a transit visa to even travel through Ireland on their way to another country;

Citizens of countries who need transit visas
Afghanistan
Albania
Cuba
Democratic Republic of the Congo
Eritrea
Ethiopia
Ghana
Iran
Iraq
Lebanon
Moldova
Nigeria
Somalia
Sri Lanka
Zimbabwe

== Tourism organisations ==
Tourism Ireland was established under the Good Friday Agreement of 1998 to promote the island of Ireland overseas. It is jointly funded by the Irish Government and the Northern Ireland Executive on a two-to-one ratio. Tourism Ireland works together with the two tourist boards on the island, Fáilte Ireland and Tourism Northern Ireland.

Fáilte Ireland is the biggest tourist body in Ireland with responsibility for promoting domestic tourism and helping to develop the sector as a leading component of the Irish economy. The organisation provides strategic and practical support to develop and sustain Ireland as a tourist destination. The organisation runs Discoverireland.ie, an award-winning website

== Sources ==
- Baddeley, M. J. B. (1890). Thorough Guide Series. Ireland (Part I). Northern Counties including Dublin and Neighbourhood (Second Edition - Revised). London: Dulau & Co., 37, Soho Square, W.
- Bush, John (1769). Hibernia Curiosa: A Letter from a Gentleman in Dublin to his Friend at Dover in Kent, Giving a general View of the Manners, Customs, Dispositions, &c. of the Inhabitants of Ireland. London: London (Printed for W. Flexney, opposite Gray's-Inn-Gate, Holbourn); Dublin (J. Potts and J. Williams).
