= Mallinson's Woodland Retreat =

Coordinates: 50.8236°N 2.9294°W

Mallinson's Woodland Retreat is a 13-acre (5.3-hectare) woodland retreat and collection of architect-designed treehouses at Holditch in west Dorset, England. Developed by British furniture designer and craftsman Guy Mallinson, the site evolved from his Woodland Workshops, a venue for teaching traditional woodworking, and an associated accommodation business originally known as Crafty Camping.

The retreat consists of three treehouses: the Woodsman's Treehouse, Dazzle and Pinwheel, developed by Mallinson in collaboration with architect Keith Brownlie and his architectural practice, latterly known as BEAM Architects.

Each of the three treehouses has received a Royal Institute of British Architects South West Award. The Woodsman's Treehouse was additionally named RIBA South West Regional Small Project of the Year in 2017, while Dazzle and Pinwheel received regional RIBA awards in 2023.

== History ==
=== Woodland Workshops and Crafty Camping ===
After moving from London to rural Dorset, Mallinson established the Woodland Workshops, offering courses in green woodworking, carving and traditional woodworking techniques.

The business later expanded to include on-site accommodation and other woodland facilities, combining craft courses with rural tourism.

In 2010, Mallinson appeared as the green-wood expert in the BBC Two series Mastercrafts, presented by Monty Don, teaching traditional woodworking techniques to three participants.

Accommodation was later added under the name Crafty Camping, initially including bell tents, a tipi and a yurt alongside the woodworking courses.

The development of the Woodsman's Treehouse in 2016 marked a shift towards purpose-built woodland accommodation. The site subsequently became known as Mallinson's Woodland Retreat.

== Treehouses ==
=== Woodsman's Treehouse ===
The Woodsman's Treehouse was completed in 2016 and was the first purpose-built treehouse at the retreat. It was developed by Mallinson in collaboration with architect Keith Brownlie, with construction undertaken by a self-build team of furniture makers and green woodworkers.

The structure was built around a mature oak while remaining structurally independent of the tree. It received a RIBA South West Award and the RIBA South West Regional Small Project of the Year award in 2017, and was included in the RIBA House of the Year longlist.

=== Dazzle ===
Dazzle was developed by Mallinson and Brownlie during 2020–21. Its exterior design was inspired by dazzle camouflage, using contrasting geometric timber finishes.

The building was designed to minimise disturbance to the woodland through the use of screw piles and reclaimed telegraph poles. It received a RIBA South West Award in 2023 and a VisitEngland Recognition of Service Excellence (ROSE) Award in the same year.

=== Pinwheel ===
Pinwheel was developed alongside Dazzle during 2020–21. Its design is based on a pinwheel form, with four timber volumes arranged around a central space and reflective glazing used to integrate the building visually with the surrounding woodland.

Pinwheel received a RIBA South West Award in 2023.

== Architecture and construction ==
Although described as treehouses, the structures do not rely on living trees for their principal structural support.

Traditional timber craftsmanship is a recurring feature of the three buildings, reflecting the collaboration between Brownlie's architectural practice and Mallinson's team of furniture makers and green woodworkers.

Construction methods included screw piles and reclaimed telegraph poles to reduce disturbance to the woodland, while locally sourced timber and timber from managed forests were used throughout the development.

The retreat developed over approximately 15 years from a woodland craft-teaching site into a group of three architect-designed treehouses.

== Media ==
The Woodsman's Treehouse was featured in Channel 4's George Clarke's Amazing Spaces.

The building was also included in the 2017 Grand Designs: House of the Year coverage of the RIBA House of the Year competition.

Mallinson's Woodland Retreat was later featured in the Channel 4 travel series World's Most Secret Hotels.

The retreat and its treehouses have also received coverage in Wallpaper*, Country Life, Dwell, The Independent and the Evening Standard.

== Expansion and sale ==
In 2025, planning permission was granted for five additional treehouses as holiday accommodation to replace five existing holiday units.

Later in 2025, Mallinson placed the retreat on the market. The property comprised approximately 13 acres of woodland and meadow, the three existing treehouses and planning consent for five additional treehouses.

== See also ==
- Guy Mallinson
- Tree house
- Green woodworking
