= NITB =

NITB may refer to:

- Northern Ireland Tourist Board
- National Institute of Technology, Bhopal
