= Fáilte Ireland =

Tourism agency of Ireland

- National Tourism Development Authority
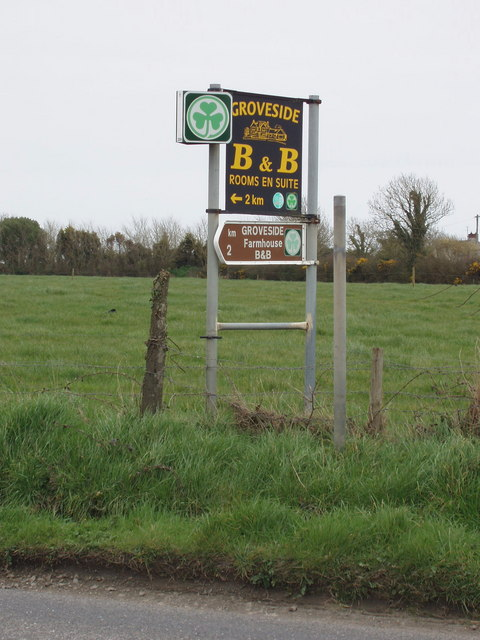
- The shamrock sign is the approved quality symbol of Fáilte Ireland, the National Tourism Development Authority.
- Predecessor: Bord Fáilte Éireann (BFÉ)
- Founder: National Tourism Development Authority Act of 2003
- Merger of: Council of Education, Recruitment and Training (CERT); Bord Fáilte Éireann (BFÉ)
- Purpose: "To provide strategic and practical support in developing and sustaining Ireland as a high-quality and competitive tourist destination"
- Headquarters: Amiens Street, Dublin 1, Ireland
- Board of directors: Paul Kelly (CEO); Paul Keeley (Director of Commercial Development); Deborah Nolan (Director of Operations); Orla Carroll (Director of Product Development); Niall Tracey (Director of Marketing)
- Website: failteireland.ie

The National Tourism Development Authority of Ireland, operating as Fáilte Ireland, supports the development and promotion of tourism within Ireland, and undertakes tourism marketing, training and research activities. It was established under the National Tourism Development Authority Act of 2003 to replace and build upon the functions of Bord Fáilte, its predecessor organisation.

== Name ==
The legal name of the body is the National Tourism Development Authority, according to the National Tourism Development Authority Act 2003 which established it. The 2003 act also empowers the body to use the trading name of Fáilte Ireland. The word fáilte is Irish for "welcome". In official Irish language texts the form Fáilte Éireann has been used.

== History ==
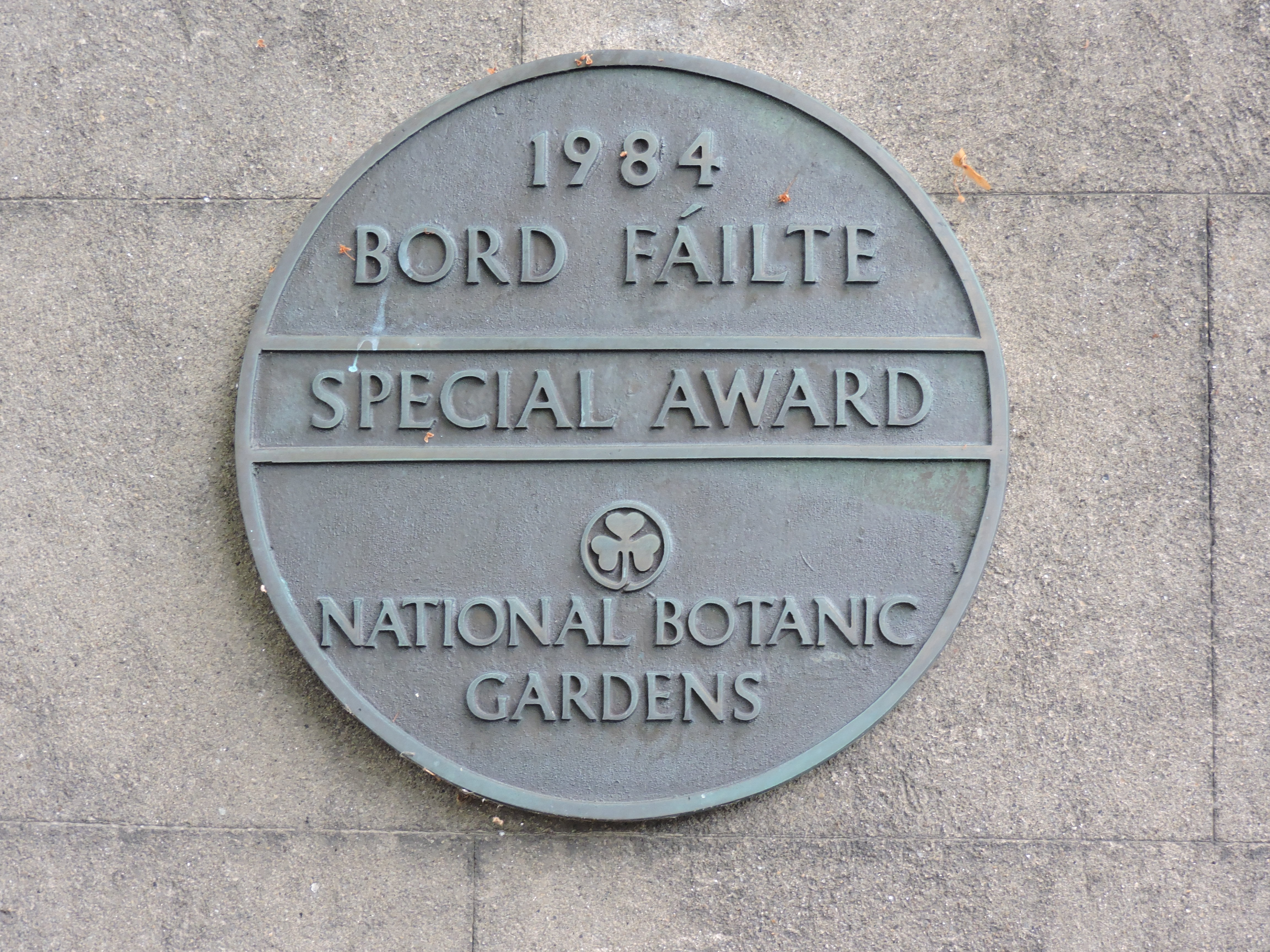
Bord Fáilte 1984 special award

After the foundation of the Irish Free State in December 1922, hoteliers and others created local tourism boards in various regions, which combined in 1924 into the Irish Tourist Association (ITA), a private organisation "promoting tourism to the benefit of the nation". (An earlier, unionist-led, ITA had existed from 1895 to 1921.) ITA lobbying led to the Irish Tourist Board being established under the Tourist Traffic Act 1939. While the outbreak of the Second World War delayed the implementation of some elements of the 1939 act, a series of surveys, the Irish Tourist Association Topographical and General Survey, were undertaken in the early 1940s.

The organisation was renamed again, to An Bord Fáilte, by the Tourist Traffic Act 1952. The same act created a separate body, Fógra Fáilte, to handle publicity. The Tourist Traffic Act 1955 remerged the two as Bord Fáilte Éireann (BFÉ or "Bord Fáilte"). An Tóstal, a summer cultural festival held from 1953 to 1959, took up the bulk of the authority's work in this period. In 1963, the Council of Education, Recruitment and Training (CERT) was created to take over training of workers in the hospitality industry.

In 1964, eight regional tourist organisations (RTOs) were established which were intended to supersede the ITA; an extraordinary general meeting called in 1964 to dissolve the ITA voted not to do so, but it nevertheless soon became defunct. The RTOs reduced in number to six in the 1980s, and were renamed regional tourist associations (RTAs) in 1996. In 1989 the Dublin RTO lost a High Court action to prevent BFÉ dissolving it; it was reconstituted as Dublin Tourism and more closely controlled by BFÉ.

In 2003, CERT and BFÉ merged to form Fáilte Ireland, to better co-ordinate with Tourism Ireland, the all-Ireland body established under the Good Friday Agreement (GFA). The advent of travel websites reduced the usefulness of the RTAs and a 2005 PricewaterhouseCoopers report recommended substantial reorganisation; as a consequence all were dissolved in 2006, except Dublin Tourism, which was made a direct subsidiary of Fáilte Ireland. (Note: Grant Thornton 2011, p.3: "Although Dublin Tourism had been in existence since 1964, it has been a subsidiary of Fáilte Ireland since 2006. At that time, all of the other dedicated regional tourism authorities in Ireland were merged into Fáilte Ireland in line with recommendations contained in a report by PwC. A decision was taken, however, not to integrate Dublin Tourism on foot of another report, the Travers Report, but instead to make it a subsidiary of Fáilte Ireland which afforded it a semi-protected status as a state body in that the Exchequer stands over its losses.") Dublin Tourism's separate status ended in 2012 in line with a 2011 report by Grant Thornton.

Fáilte Ireland played a leading role in The Gathering Ireland 2013, a year-long programme of events encouraging members of the Irish diaspora to visit their region of origin.

== Activities ==
The goal of Fáilte Ireland is to provide strategic and practical support in the "long-term sustainable growth in the economic, social, cultural and environmental contribution of tourism to Ireland". Fáilte Ireland works with tourism interests to support the industry in Ireland in its efforts to be "more profitable and to help individual tourist enterprises enhance their performance".

Its activities fall into four areas:

- Tourism marketing: provides marketing support and a range of promotional opportunities for Irish product providers, marketing groups, tour operators, handling agents, and other tourism interests as well as visitor services to consumers. Fáilte Ireland's "Festivals and Cultural Events Initiative" and "Sports Tourism Initiative" fall under this heading.
- Training services: provides education and advice for people working in the tourism industry. Fáilte Ireland has previously run campaigns to encourage and support young people in choosing a career in the tourism sector.
- Product development: provides support for selective capital investment in tourism products through grant-aid and tax incentive schemes and encourages new products and areas of service.
- Research and statistics: provides overviews of tourism performance and profiles tourism development to provide a knowledge base to guide industry development and services.

== Management team ==
Name	Role	Ref.
Paul Kelly	Chief Executive of Fáilte Ireland	
Paul Keeley	Director of Commercial Development	
Deborah Nolan	Director of Operations	
Orla Carroll	Director of Product Development	
Niall Tracey	Director of Marketing	

On 15 August 2020, the Chairman of Fáilte Ireland, Michael Cawley, resigned after it emerged he travelled to Italy on holiday during the COVID-19 pandemic; his decision to holiday abroad had sparked controversy and criticism as it coincided with a campaign from Fáilte Ireland urging holidaymakers to engage in staycations.

== Tourism regions ==
Fáilte Ireland has identified and markets several tourism regions, including The Wild Atlantic Way, Ireland's Ancient East, and Ireland's Hidden Heartlands.

Dublin Tourism, a somewhat antonymous regional tourism authority, was formerly responsible for promoting tourism in the Dublin region. It merged into Fáilte Ireland in 2012.

== See also ==
- Northern Ireland Tourist Board
