= VisitBritain =

Tourist board in the United Kingdom

British Tourist Authority
- VisitBritain logo
- Trade name: VisitBritain; VisitEngland
- Formerly: British Travel & Holiday Association
- Industry: Tourism
- Founded: April 2003
- Area served: England; Great Britain; Northern Ireland (promotion only)
Other UK counterparts
- England: VisitEngland
- Northern Ireland: Tourism Northern Ireland
- Scotland: VisitScotland
- Wales: Visit Wales
- Website: visitbritain.com (visitors); visitbritain.org (corporate)

The British Tourist Authority (formerly the British Travel & Holiday Association), trading as VisitBritain and VisitEngland, is a non-departmental public body, promoting tourism to England, and Great Britain as a whole, incorporated under the Development of Tourism Act 1969. Under memoranda of understanding with the Northern Ireland Tourist Board and the offshore islands of Guernsey, Jersey and the Isle of Man, VisitBritain also hosts information on them on its website. However, under the 1969 Act, the remit of the organisation extends only to Great Britain rather than the whole of the United Kingdom.

VisitBritain was created in April 2003 to market Great Britain to the rest of the world and to promote and develop the visitor economy of England. It was formed out of a merger between the British Tourist Authority and the English Tourism Council, and is a non-departmental public body responsible to the Department for Culture, Media and Sport. In April 2009, VisitEngland became more of a stand-alone body from VisitBritain, more on a par with the devolved entities, VisitScotland and Visit Wales.

In 2005, it was voted the world's leading Tourist and Convention Bureau in the World Travel Awards. In the Webby Awards it has been an Official Honoree in the 10th and 12th Webby Awards in the Tourism Category. In 2008 it was also awarded the Travelmole Best Tourist Board Website award.

VisitBritain is a founding partner of ENAT, the European Network for Accessible Tourism, an international organisation based in Europe, set up in 2006 to promote accessible tourism.

== See also ==
- VisitEngland
- Tourism Northern Ireland
- VisitScotland
- Visit Wales
- Tourism Ireland – All-island tourism body for both Northern Ireland and the Republic of Ireland
