= Visit Wales =

Welsh government tourism organisation

- Native name: Croeso Cymru (Welsh)
- Industry: Tourism
- Area served: Wales
- Parent: Welsh Government
- Website: visitwales.com (English) croeso.cymru (Welsh)

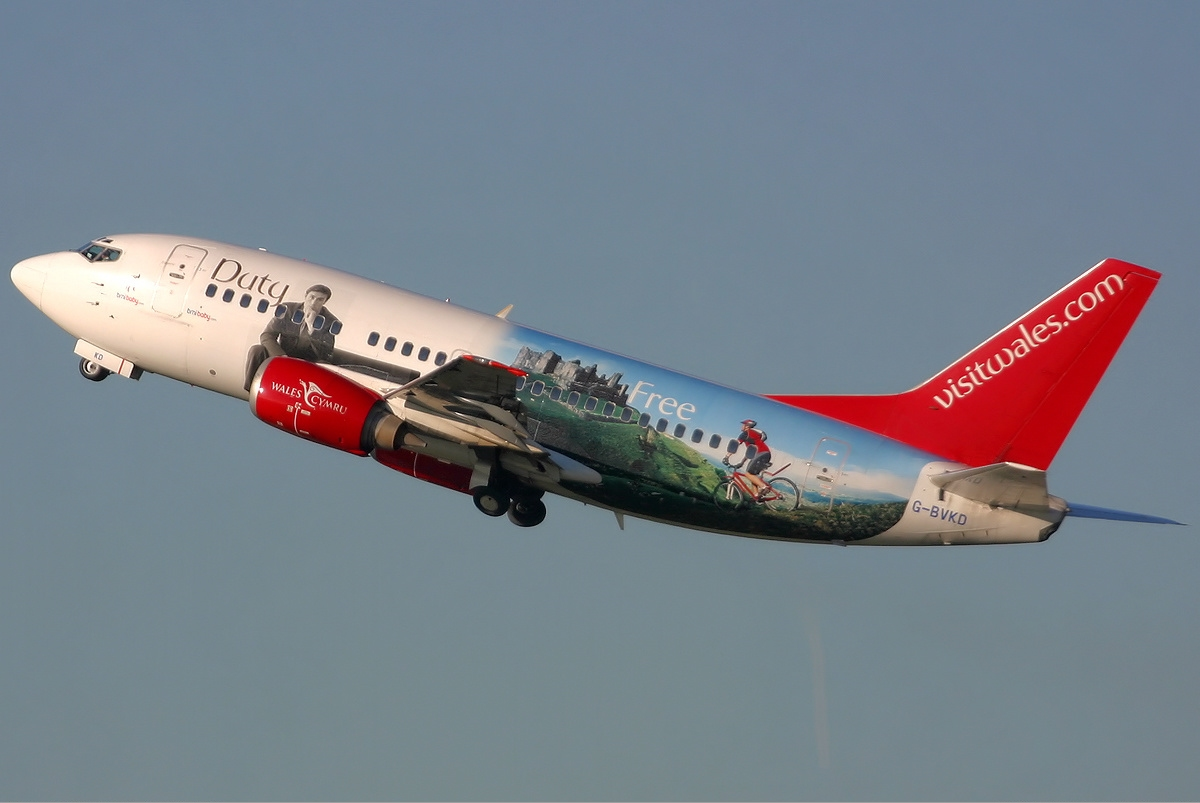
Visit Wales branding on a Bmibaby Boeing 737-500 logojet.

Visit Wales (Welsh: Croeso Cymru) is the Welsh Government's tourism organisation. Its aim is to promote Welsh tourism and assist the tourism industry.

== History ==
The Wales Tourist Board was established in 1969 as a result of the Development of Tourism Act 1969 and its role was enhanced following the Tourism (Overseas promotion) (Wales) Act 1992. An 'Abolition Order' was passed by the National Assembly for Wales 23 November 2005 and full transfer of functions into the Welsh Assembly Government was made 1 April 2006. On that day, the Wales Tourist Board ceased to exist.

Visit Wales changed their prominent campaign of "Visit Wales" in late March 2020 due to the high numbers of visitors from Wales and the United Kingdom to tourist hotspots to "Visit Wales. Later." Additionally they stated, "Please do not visit Wales at this time and avoid all unnecessary travel within Wales."

Visit Wales has taken over the functions of the former Wales Tourist Board, an Assembly Sponsored Public Body. The role of Visit Wales is to support the Welsh tourism industry, improve tourism in Wales and provide a strategic framework within which private enterprise can achieve sustainable growth and success, so improving the social and economic well-being of Wales. The mission of Visit Wales is to "maximise tourism's contribution to the economic, social and cultural prosperity of Wales".

The baseline budget at the Wales Tourist Board for 2005/2006 was £22.6 million.

Its stated goals are: to grow a stronger and more defined brand for tourism in Wales; to focus investment and innovation in tourism; to drive an increase in visitor volume and value to Wales each year.

As of 2019, tourists were spending over £8 million a day on trips in Wales, amounting to around £3 billion a year. In direct terms, tourism contributes 3.7% of whole-economy value added in Wales. Approximately 140,000 people in Wales are employed in tourism, representing about 9% of the workforce; (cf 2% of jobs in Wales provided by “agriculture, forestry and fisheries” - figures from statswales.gov.uk for 2019).

== Tourist information centres ==
Prior to 2020, there were 65 tourist information centres around Wales, offering local information, accommodation booking services and other services.

This network of centres offers a service to the 13 million visitors that come to Wales every year. They are run by over 40 different managing authorities and Visit Wales co-ordinates the network to set and monitor standards of presentation, information and customer care.

== See also ==
- VisitBritain
- VisitEngland
- VisitScotland
