= Charlotte Vaudeville =

French Indologist

- Born: 1918; La Tronche
- Died: 28 April 2006
- Citizenship: French
- Education: École Nationale des Chartes
- Known for: Exegeses on Kabir and other bhakti saints
- Scientific career
- Fields: Indology
- Workplaces: École française d'Extrême-Orient
- Academic advisors: Jules Bloch, Louis Renou
- Notable students: Françoise Mallison

Charlotte Vaudeville (1918 — 28 April 2006) was a French Indologist, best known for her researches into the bhakti traditions and literature. Her treatises on the medieval saint Kabir have been lauded. She retired as a professor at the University of Sorbonne Nouvelle Paris 3 in 1988.

== Life and career ==
Charlotte Louise Marie Vaudeville was born in La Tronche, France in 1918. She graduated with a degree in classics in 1939, a diploma in Indian studies in 1942 and in Hindi in 1943 from the Institut national des langues et civilisations orientales. A Doctor of Letters degree followed in 1950.

Vaudeville studied under Jules Bloch and Louis Renou, adapting their philological approach to religious literature to incorporate the social aspect of composition.

In 1945, she studied classical Avadhi at Allahabad, with the Tulsidas Ramcharitmanas becoming the subject of her thesis. This was her first book, published in 1955. She also worked on Kabir's poems at the Banaras Hindu University, translating them into French. Her two monographs, Kabir Granthavali (1957) and Kabir (in English, 1974), became the definitive references on the saint. Especially conclusive was her establishment of the corpus of sayings that could be attributed to him personally via critical analyses of the texts.

Recognising the currency of medieval religious songs even in the 20th century, she continued her studies of the works of Mirabai, Surdas, and Jayasi. Her Dhola-Maru (1962), a compendium of Rajasthani ballads, and Barahmâsâ (1965) demonstrated how Hindu tradition fed folksongs and vernacular poetry.

Vaudeville worked at the École française d'Extrême-Orient (EFEO) between 1958 and 1963. She then worked at the Institut français d'indologie (French Institute of Indology) at Pondicherry, concentrating on Hindi and Marathi languages. She became Head of Studies at the École pratique des hautes études (EPHE) in 1963. Until 1971, she also ran EFEO's Poona, which became part of the Deccan College. She retired from her professorship at the University of Sorbonne Nouvelle Paris 3 in 1988.

Switching from Hindi to Marathi, Vaudeville published her investigations into the Haripath of Dnyandev in 1982.

In her early career, Vaudeville also investigated the Krishna tradition of Braj, in which she revealed its Saivite foundation.

Charlotte Vaudeville's works in Indian religious lore combined the archaeological and classical background to medieval and modern tradition. She combined ethnological fieldwork with textual analyses, establishing a methodology that was followed by subsequent scholars. Her especial focus was on the bhakti tradition.

A further path of analysis was on ginan, Ismaili folk literature that was similar to padas, a Hindu style of poetry. Vaudeville established the role of Islam in the emergence of Hindu vernacular literatures, which were able to echo popular protests against the intellectual prestige of Sanskrit-based sacred texts.

== Selected works ==
- Étude sur les sources et la composition du Râmâyana de Tulsî-Dâs. Paris: Libr. d'Amérique et d'Orient-Adrien Maisonneuve. 1955.
- Les Duhâ de Dhola-Mârû. Une ancienne ballade du Râjasthân. Pondicherry: Institut français d'indologie. 1962.
- Kabir. Oxford: Clarendon. 1974.
- Le Râmâyan de Tulsî-Dâs. Texte hindi traduit et commenté. Paris: Les Belles Lettres. 1977.
- Kabîr-Vânî, recension occidentale, introd. et concordances. Pondicherry: Institut français d'indologie. 1982.
- Myths, Saints and Legends in Medieval India. Delhi: Oxford University. 1996.
