= Mallinson =

- Pronunciation: English: /ˈmælɪnsən/
- Language: English

Origin
- Language: English
- Meaning: Little, or son of, Malle (Mary)
- Region of origin: England

Other names
- Variant forms: Malkinson, Malinson

Mallinson is an English surname. Notable people with the surname include:

- Albert Mallinson (1870–1946), English composer
- Allan Mallinson (born 1949), English author and army officer
- Brian Mallinson (born 1947), British cricketer
- David Mallinson (born 1946), English footballer
- James Mallinson (1943–2018), English record producer
- Sir James Mallinson (born 1970), British indologist, writer, translator and nobleman
- Jeremy Mallinson, English naturalist and conservationist
- John Mallinson (trade unionist) (1860–1929), British politician
- John C. Mallinson (1932–2015), British physicist
- Roger Mallinson (born 1945), British submariner rescued from sunken submersible Pisces III in 1973
- Rory Mallinson (1913–1976), American actor
- Guy Mallinson (born 1963), English furniture designer and craftsman

== See also ==
- Mallison
- Mallinson baronets
- Charles Mallinson, fictional character in James Hilton's novel Lost Horizon
