= VisitScotland =

Scottish national tourism organisation

Organisation overview
- Formed: 1969; 57 years ago (as the Scottish Tourist Board)
- Type: Executive non-departmental public body
- Jurisdiction: Scotland
- Headquarters: Waverley Court, 4 E Market St, Edinburgh
- Employees: 482 (2024)
- Minister responsible: Stephen Flynn MSP, Cabinet Secretary for Economy, Tourism and Transport
- Organisation executives: Vicki Miller, Chief Executive; Stephen Leckie, Chairperson
- Website: www.visitscotland.com

VisitScotland, formerly the Scottish Tourist Board (Scottish Gaelic: Bòrd Turasachd na h-Alba), is the national tourism and events organisation for Scotland. It is an executive non-departmental public body of the Scottish Government, with offices across Scotland.

Among the organisation's tasks is promotion of Scotland internationally and the attraction of visitors through advertising, promotional campaigns and in-market activity, intermediary marketing and route development. VisitScotland also manages a number of quality grading schemes for tourist accommodation and attractions.

== Aims and operation ==
VisitScotland's purpose is to support the development of Scotland’s visitor economy by promoting tourism, providing support to tourism businesses, and working with partners in the tourism sector.

The organisation also seeks to work with the tourism industry in Scotland to maintain standards in visitor attractions and accommodation provision. It does this through a number of specific quality grading schemes. VisitScotland also runs the Thistle Awards, which are awarded to the best tourism businesses each year.

The organisation also works with the tourism and events industry in Scotland to provide business support, industry insight, trade opportunities and global market access. VisitScotland delivers the National Events Funding Programme and International Events Funding Programme, as well as providing support and advice to develop regional plans aligned to the national events strategy. VisitScotland also runs the annual "Connect" travel trade show and national Thistle Awards, which are awarded to the best tourism and events businesses each year.

== History ==
The history of VisitScotland dates back to the establishment of the Scottish Tourist Board (STB) in 1945, which aimed to promote tourism in Scotland. A recognition of the importance of tourism to the UK economy resulted in The Development of the Tourism Act (1969), which came into force on 25 July 1969.

The first branded Scotland's Travel Trade Fair (STFF) was held in May 1980, attracting 180 Scottish exhibitors in its first year along with 80 UK travel agents and tour operators, plus 120 from overseas who were brought by the then British Tourist Authority. In 1985, the Tourism (Overseas Promotion) (Scotland) Act allowed the STB direct access to overseas markets for the first time.

The Scotland Act 1994 required the establishment of area tourist boards, of which there were 14. In April 2005, the existing 14 boards were wound up and two new boards (at the time called network tourist boards) were established in their place. The Scottish Tourist Board and the network tourist boards operated under the banner of VisitScotland. The Tourist Boards (Scotland) Act 2006 intended to abolish the network tourist boards, to rename the Scottish Tourist Board as VisitScotland and to increase its maximum number of board members.

Since its formation, the role of VisitScotland has evolved to include establishing and distributing the Scotland overseas publication, managing bookings and information provision via tourism information centres, managing quality grading schemes for tourist accommodation and attractions, erecting tourism signage across Scotland, developing TV campaigns, and delivering a travel agent training programme. Following the COVID-19 pandemic, VisitScotland delivered recovery funding to the tourism industry.

To deliver the first ever 2023 UCI Cycling World Championships, VisitScotland established a wholly-owned subsidiary company called 2023 Cycling World Championships Ltd (Cycling Worlds). The subsidiary was created specifically to plan, organise and stage the event, which brought together multiple cycling world championships into a single mega-event across Scotland. The event reputedly resulted in a £205m gross value added economic impact for Scotland.

== Website ==
VisitScotland.com is the official website of VisitScotland. This website provides bookings and information service for visitors to Scotland. From 2001 this website was operated as a public-private partnership venture, though this venture (and the website) was brought back into public ownership in 2008.

VisitScotland.com was initially the trading name of eTourism Ltd, a private limited company set up by a public-private partnership. In 2003 the IT services group SchlumbergerSema was taken over by Atos. There was a major restructuring in July 2006 that saw VisitScotland increase its stake from 25% to 36%, Austrian booking specialist Tiscover took a 35% share and ATOS reduced its stake from 60% to 7%. Partnerships UK Ltd had also been shareholders.

The ownership of VisitScotland.com became a divisive issue within the Scottish tourism industry. A number of accommodation providers lodged a petition with the Scottish Parliament to return the group to public ownership, arguing that the use of public money to fund the parent company eTourism Ltd was disrupting competition, an assertion which eTourism unconditionally rejected.

In 2008, a Scottish Parliament inquiry led by Tavish Scott considered some problems associated with the website and made the recommendation that the Scottish Government find additional resources to resolve these. On 7 November 2008, it was announced that ownership of VisitScotland.com was to be transferred solely to VisitScotland, with £1.2 million of funds being used to purchase shares from all other shareholders.

== See also ==
- Tourism in Scotland
- VisitBritain
- VisitEngland
- Visit Wales
