= Tourism region =

Geographical area with a homogeneous character

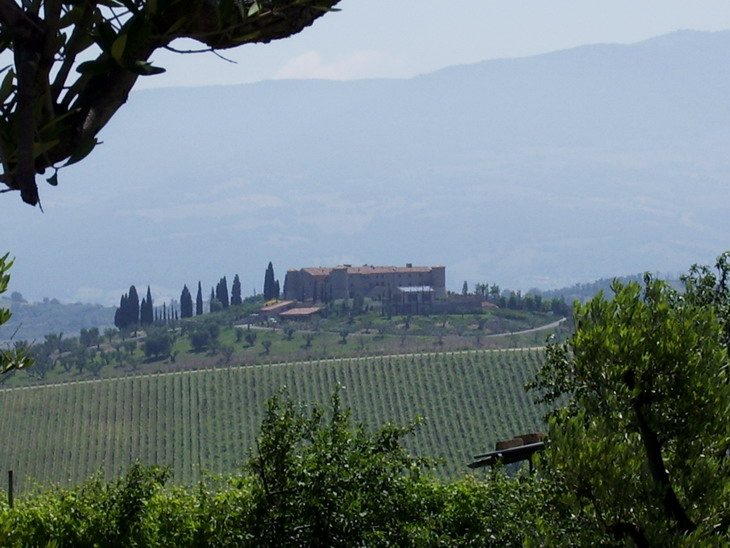
Scenic landscape of Tuscany, Italy

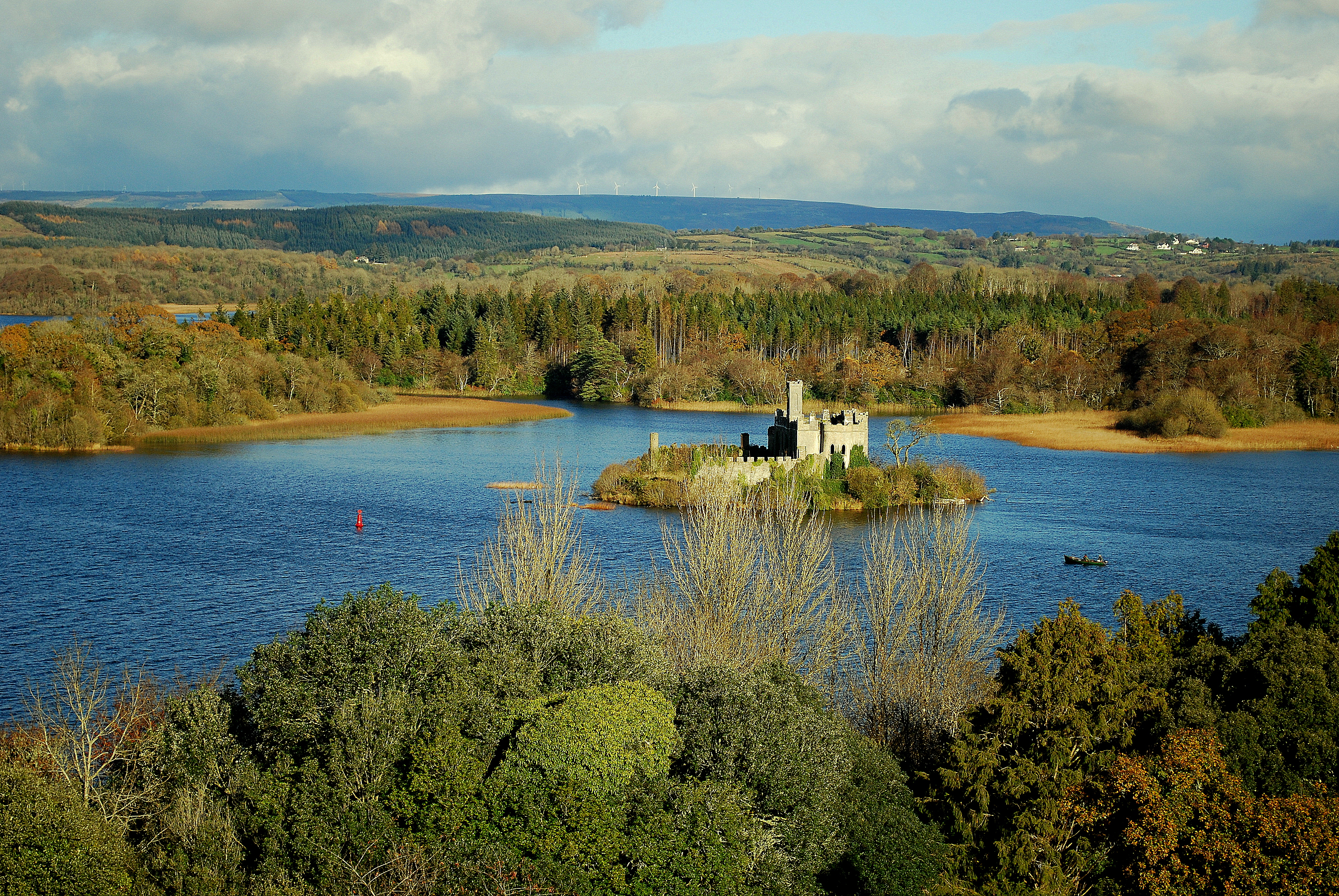
Ireland's Hidden Heartlands

A tourism region is a geographical region that has been designated by a governmental organization or tourism bureau as having common cultural or environmental characteristics. These regions are often named after historical or current administrative and geographical regions. Others have names created specifically for tourism purposes. The names often evoke certain positive qualities of the area and suggest a coherent tourism experience to visitors. Countries, states, provinces, and other administrative regions are often carved up into tourism regions. In addition to drawing the attention of potential tourists, these tourism regions often provide tourists who are otherwise unfamiliar with an area with a manageable number of attractive options.

Some of the more famous tourism regions based on historical or current administrative regions include Tuscany in Italy and Yucatán in Mexico. Famous examples of regions created by a government or tourism bureau include the United Kingdom's Lake District and California's Wine Country in the United States.

== Development ==
Tourism scholar Jaarko Saarinen has identified a "discourse of region" in which a region's social and geographical qualities are combined with familiar and traditional representations of the region. The resulting discourse is "produced and reproduced" in the form of advertisements, travelogues, and regional literature, as well as in the larger media. Most tourism regions belong to a larger economic and administrative unit which takes on the role of developing the discourse of the tourism region into a marketable product. According to Saarinen, once the discourse of a tourism region has been established, the parent region helps shape further development of the area as a tourism region. This earlier period is characterized by rapid development, construction, investment in greater advertising, and increasing tourism. Eventually, if the region becomes successful as a tourism region, a mature stage in the development of a tourism region is reached where the "meaning and history of the destination are continually produced anew" in cycles of decline, reinvention, growth, and stability.

== History ==
=== 18th and 19th centuries ===
Historically, tourism regions often developed in areas widely considered to be of historical, cultural, or natural importance such as the Niagara Falls region of New York and Canada, the Lake District of England, the French Riviera and the Italian Riviera. Others developed around specific attractions such as a major city, i.e. Paris, or a monument such as the Pyramids of Giza. Tourist regions have existed for thousands of years for relaxation and leisure as well as for religious expression. The ancient Romans visited the hot springs of Bath in Roman Britain while Santiago de Compostela was a site of mass Christian pilgrimage supported by a major medieval tourism industry that provided travelers with accommodations along their pilgrimage route.

The modern tourism region emerged from the Industrial Revolution as cities grew in size, pollution increased, and an expanding middle class possessed greater amounts of disposable income. From the Enlightenment through the nineteenth century, the fashionable Grand Tour of continental Europe for wealthy young men popularized the idea of leisure travel. The popularity of the Grand Tour, combined with the stresses and benefits of the Industrial Revolution, encouraged wealthy and middle-class European and American families to explore leisure travel, though on a more local scale. These families began frequenting seaside resorts known for their health benefits such as the Roman resort town of Bath, particularly during hotter months that left industrializing cities extremely unpleasant.

The development of faster methods of transportation during the nineteenth century allowed tourists to travel greater distances in smaller periods of time. This period also saw the "seaside" developed as a "spatial area for 'mass tourism,'” a phenomenon that resulted in the development of specific coastal areas as tourist regions. Among elite groups in the nineteenth century, "the mountains" also became increasingly popular in the winter months; the most popular of these regions was Tyrol in Austria. Tourism regions were often subject to downward mobility as areas frequented by the upper class such as the Catskill Mountains of New York and Bath in England were abandoned by wealthier visitors when they became too popular with the middle class.

The romantic movement of the 19th century encouraged the appreciation of the natural world, leading to the explosion in popularity of scenic tourism regions such as the English Lake District and the Niagara Falls region. According to Peter Murphy, "increased competition" encouraged private development of hotels, resorts, and entertainment facilities as well as "municipal investment in parades, parks, piers, and baths." These trends marked an important intervention of the state into the evolution of tourism regions.

=== 20th century ===
In the late 19th and early 20th centuries, governments increasingly took a role in encouraging the development of tourism regions. Federal and state governments in the United States, with the encouragement of conservation groups, and European countries and their colonies began setting aside areas as parks, monuments, and trails for preservation and future enjoyment. Some of these, such as Niagara Falls, were existing tourism regions while parks such as Yellowstone National Park were areas selected by these organizations as future tourism regions.

At the same time, regions became an increasingly important aspects of nationalism. It is also during this period that the English phrase "tourist region" came into use. Eric Storm has argued that in the later decades of the nineteenth century "the stress was put on the region in order to underline the intimate bond between everyone's own community and the nation". According to Strom, many people believed that "only by being faithful to its own character could the region contribute to the welfare of the whole". The idea of the region as part of a whole nation gained further ground in the first years of the twentieth century, particularly after World War I, as an argument was advanced that "every region had its own 'soul'...an organic part of the nation". During this period, regional officials and businesses began promoting regions as tourist destination. Through this process, "tourism promoters strove to balance the demands of multiple identities: local, regional, state, national ... They instructed their audiences that the regions' political, social, and economic fates were inextricably bound to their landscapes and geography". Tourists were portrayed "as important historical actors whose engagement ... played a vital role in shaping the outcome of that bond".

Although local and regional governments took the larger role in promoting regional tourism in the late nineteenth and early twentieth centuries, during the Great Depression of the 1930s, national governments in Europe and the United States began aggressively promoting travel within their own borders. In doing so, they drew upon nationalist sentiment to imbue tourism regions within the state with greater cultural and historical meaning. Travel became a patriotic gesture as citizens and subjects were encouraged to explore their nation's tourism regions. Nazi Germany's Strength through Joy program subsidized travel for working-class Germans. One of the major projects of the program included "assert[ing] that Germans everywhere should be interested in the various regions" of Germany and that "part of preserving German culture...was to get to know it in all its variants". According to D. Medina Lasansky, in Italy, one piece of tourism literature argued that "every region of Italy represents a page in the great book of shining national glories from which each one of us could learn to be proud of being Italian".

In the United States, "regional diversity" gave strength to a national whole in the United States' tourist guidebooks produced by the New Deal's Federal Writers' Project. As Andrew Gross argued, the guidebooks "transform[ed] local culture into a tourist attraction, and the tourist attraction into a symbol of national loyalty, in order to reproduce patriotism as a form of brand-name identification". In these WPA guides, the region became an object of nostalgia, a victim of the national identity that flourished through celebration of the regionalism it was helping to weaken.

== Recent developments ==
Continuing earlier trends, governments have attempted to maximize tourism potential by reverse engineering tourism regions. This process consists of dividing their territories into discrete tourism regions in such a way that every inch of that country, state, or region is given an attractive name, provided with advertising, and basic tourism infrastructure such as signage. Some traditionally heavily touristed countries such as France have implemented this strategy to encourage tourists who would normally only spend time in more famous areas such as Paris and the French Riviera to venture out into designated tourism regions such as the Western Loire Valley and Franche-Comté. The first of these is a more recently constructed region, while Franche-Comté has been a distinct political and cultural region since the Middle Ages.

Other governments, such as that of the American state of Nebraska, have attempted to use the creation of tourism regions to help produce a tourism industry in a state not frequently considered by potential tourists. The state's "Lewis and Clark" region in northeast Nebraska and the "Frontier Trails" region of south-central Nebraska attempt to deemphasize the state's reputation as a place people cross on their way somewhere else by capitalizing the role the state's territory played in the United States' often romanticized project of westward expansion.

== Non-government regions and eco-museums ==
A counter-trend to the establishment of government-designated tourism regions is that of local voluntary associations which cooperate to market a specific area. One popular type is an ecomuseum which promotes natural and cultural tourism in rural areas. Ecomuseums originated in France in the 1970s and have spread across Europe and to North America as well.

For example, the Canadian province of Alberta rationalized its tourism regions during 1998 to six, down from nearly twenty. Despite this, local initiatives continue to promote much smaller areas than the six massive official regions, which are larger than many European countries. For example, the "Might Peace Tourism Association" is a grouping of local municipalities in the Peace Country, which has existed since 1963. Likewise, the Kalyna Country eco-museum serves a similar role in East-Central Alberta.

== Specialty regions ==
=== Wine regions ===
German Wine Route Sign

Building on the success of enotourism in regions such as California's Wine Country, the number of wine regions catering to tourists has grown in recent decades. Although wine regions have existed since the 1850s in France, wine tourism became increasingly popular in the 1970s. Wine regions such as Bordeaux and Burgundy in France were joined by regions in California, Italy, Spain, and even New York as areas of interest to the potential wine tourist. Currently, several dozen countries have their own wine regions, while many of these countries have dozens of regions within their borders. Many wine regions do not correspond to designated tourism regions. For example, the famous Bordeaux region in France is part of the political and tourism region of Aquitaine, while the Mosel wine region of Germany is located in the Rhineland-Palatinate state and extends far to the northeast of the Moselle and Saar tourism region.

According to C. Michael Hall, a wine region's success depends not only upon its grapes and the experience of wine tasting, but also on its "infrastructure, physical environment, scenery, regional cuisine and the social and cultural components of the wine region"—in short, the major characteristics of tourism regions more generally. Wine routes are also a popular feature of wine regions, helping to guide the wine tourist from vineyard to vineyard. Often these wine routes are marked by signs along the region's highways which also serve to inform non-wine tourists of the existence of the wine region.

== Future trends ==
As globalization and supranationalist organizations such as the European Union encourage the renewal of interest in cross-border regions, tourism regions may increasingly assume a more transnational form. For example, the Euroregions of the European Union allow areas that have been separated by the borders of nation-states to reassert some cultural and political sovereignty. The Euroregion of Tyrol-South Tyrol-Trentino was formed to encourage cross-border cooperation between Austria's Tyrol region and Italy's provinces Trentino and South Tyrol, all three formerly part of the Austrian County of Tyrol that once encompassed a large area of the eastern Alps. One of the goals of this partnership is the establishment of Tyrol-South Tyrol-Trentino as a coherent tourism region. To further this goal, the Euroregion has produced an extensive travel guide of the region on the Internet. In addition to Tyrol, some of the many Euroregions that have positioned themselves as tourist regions include the Adriatic Euroregion, which has a Commission for Tourism and Culture, and the Silesian Euroregion, comprising parts of Poland, Slovakia, and the Czech Republic, and which also has an official tourism initiative.
