= Françoise Mallison =

- Born: November 14, 1940; Lyon
- Citizenship: French
- Education: École Nationale des Chartes
- Scientific career
- Fields: Indology
- Workplaces: École française d'Extrême-Orient
- Theses: Le cartulaire de l'abbaye de Signy, ordre de Cîteaux, au diocèse de Reims (1964); Satî-Gîtâ, le chant de la femme fidèle, traduction de la version gujarati (1969)
- Doctoral advisor: Charlotte Vaudeville

Françoise Mallison (born in Lyon, 1940, and dead in Anduze, 2026) is a French Indologist specialising in the history and religious traditions of Gujarat.

== Life and career ==
Françoise Mallison was born in Lyon in 1940. She read Medieval studies at the École Nationale des Chartes from 1960. After she submitted her thesis, she worked as a curator at the French National Archives between 1964 and 1967, and again between 1969 and 1971.

Mallison also studied the Hindi language at the École nationale des langues orientales vivantes from 1962. Supervised by Charlotte Vaudeville, she defended her dissertation Satî-Gîtâ, le chant de la femme fidèle, traduction de la version gujarati (Sati-Gita: the song of the faithful woman; translated from the Gujarati) in 1969. She was then attached to the École française d'Extrême-Orient (EFEO)'s Pune branch, which she headed between 1971 and 1977.

Returning to France, she lectured at the École pratique des hautes études, and then supervised a research programme on the history and philology of Western India in the Middle Ages at the EFEO. She retired from the EFEO in October 1994.

=== Religious studies ===
Mallison's area of research is pre-modern and medieval Gujarati literature. She has rediscovered and analyzed texts from the last thousand years, ranging from hymns such as the Prabhatiyam to the Ginans of the Ismailis, and local interpretations of Sanskrit epics such as the Ramayana.

In her researches into religious sects of Gujarat, she has shown that some hymns (such as the Sant Vani) transcended religious boundaries. She proposed that a Naklamki (the tenth avatar of Vishnu, also known as Kalki) cult in Saurashtra started by Ismaili Khojas in the nineteenth century, using Hindu terms such as avatar and borrowing classical Hindu stories, became a Hindu cult. Another example of transcultural diffusion of religious texts that Mallison uncovered was the Delami Aradh. Between the 13th and 15th centuries, this ritual began with Ismailis and then was adopted by Gujarati Mahamargis, a Tantric sect. The Mahamargis themselves, she showed, was an ecumenical cult but chiefly run by an untouchable caste, the Meghvals.

Mallison investigated the spread of the bhakti teachings of Vallabha, a fifteenth century itinerant saint. She claimed that his doctrines, based on Krishna-worship – already well-established in Gujarat – were especially popular among the merchant bania caste, because he taught that the pursuit of material gain was compatible with bhakti. This was countered by the argument that the Bhagavad Gita already confirmed the consonance between one's faith and one's varna-related calling.

A major religious movement Mallison studied was that of Swaminarayan. She showed that origin stories of its founder Sahajanand Swami, a yogi, resemble those of the Hindu deity Krishna; he is depicted in garb resembling that of the god, and one of the nicknames of Krishna, Ranachhoda, under which he is worshipped at Dwarka was also given to the yogi. These allow the followers of the movement to identify Sahajanand with Krishna.

=== Cultural traditions ===
Mallison explored the spread of vernacular culture in Gujarat via dhol songs. These were popular depictions of folklore that were at one time widespread, but later came to be associated with the Vallabha sect.

Mallison reconstructed the history of the Braj Language School in Bhuj, Gujarat, a cultural institution that educated poets and professional writers from 1749 to 1948. She was able to collect and publish a narrative of the school from widely dispersed technical literature and poetry from the school.

== Selected works ==
- F. Mallison (2016). "Gujarati Socio-religious Context of Swaminarayan Devotion and Doctrine". In R.B. Williams; Y. Trivedi (eds.). Swaminarayan Hinduism: Tradition, Adaptation, Identity.
- F. Mallison (2011). "The Teaching of Braj, Gujarati, and Bardic Poetry at the Court of Kutch: The Bhuj Brajbhāṣā Pāṭhśālā (1749-1948)". In Pollock, Sheldon (ed.). Forms of Knowledge in Early Modern Asia: Explanations in the Intellectual History of India and Tibet, 1500-1700. Durham: Duke University Press.
- T.R. Kassam; F. Mallison, eds. (2010). Gināns: Texts and Contexts : Essays on Ismaili Hymns from South Asia in Honour of Zawahir Moir. Primus Books. ISBN 9788190891875.
- F. Mallison (2009). "The Delamī Ārādh of Devāyat Paṇḍit: A Ritual Text of the Early Nizārī Ismailis of Western India still in Use among the Present Tantric Mahāmārgī of Gujarat". In Pauwels, Heidi Rika Maria (ed.). Patronage and Popularisation: Pilgrimage and Processions, Channels of Transcultural Translation and Transmission in Early Modern South Asia. Papers in Honour of Monika Horstmann. Studies in Oriental Religions. Vol. 58. Weisbaden: Harrassowitz Verlag.
- F. Mallison (2008). "Bārmatī Panth: A Messianic Sect Established in Sindh, Kutch, and Saurashtra". In Boivin, Michel (ed.). Sindh Through History and Representations, French Contributions to Sindhi Studies. Karachi: Oxford University Press.
- F. Mallison (2006). "The Socio-Religious Context of the Gujarati Devotional Songs of the Ciśtī Sampradāy of Kāyamuddīn Bāvā: Eighteenth Century". Devotional Expressions of South Asian Muslims. London: Institute of Ismaili Studies.
- F. Mallison (2003). "Saints and Sacred Places in Saurashtra and Kutch: The Cases of the Naklaṁkī Cult and the Jakhs". In Granoff, Phyllis; Shinohara, Koichi (eds.). Pilgrims, Patrons and Place: Localizing Sancitity in Asian Religions. Vancouver-Toronto: University of British Columbia Press.
- F. Mallison (2001). "Resistant Gīnāns and the Quest for an Ismā'īlī and Islamic Identity among the Khojās". In Dalmia, Vasudha; Malinar, Angelika; Christof, Martin (eds.). Charisma and Canon: Essays on the Religious History of the Indian Subcontinent. New Delhi: Oxford University Press.
- F. Mallison (2000). Blackburn, Stuart (ed.). "Contradictions and Misunderstandings in the Literary Response to Colonial Culture in Nineteenth-Century Gujarat". South Asia Research. 20 (2, Literary Initiatives: Literature and Colonialism in South Asia): 119–132. doi:10.1177/026272800002000203.
- F. Mallison (2000). "Sant-vāṇī and Harijan, Mahāmārgī Bhajan and Ismā'īlī Ginān: A New Appraisal of Popular Devotion in Saurashtra". In Offredi, Mariola (ed.). The Banyan Tree: Essays on Early Literature in New Indo-Aryan Languages. Venice: Università degli Studi di Venezia, Dipartimento di Studi Eurasiatici.
- F. Mallison (1998). "Le discours hagiographique dans les biographies du saint-poète gujarati Narasimha Mahetâ (XVe siècle, Inde occidentale)". Bulletin de l'École Française d'Extrême-Orient. 85: 265–283. doi:10.3406/befeo.1998.3833.
- F. Mallison (1996). "Puṣṭimārgī Poetry in Gujarati: The Lord of Braj Travelled to Gujarat Twice". Sambodhi. 20. Ahmedabad: L.D. Institute of Indology.
- F. Mallison (1996). "Hymnologies vishnuite, jaina, parsi, tantrique et islamique en gujarati: Mode de transmission et thèmes convergents". In Champion-Servan-Schreiber, Catherine (ed.). Tranditions orales dan le monde indien. Puruṣārtha (in French). Vol. 18. Paris: Éditions de l'École des hautes études en sciences sociales.
- F. Mallison (1995). "Hagiography and Sects in the Medieval Vaiṣṇava Bhakti of Western India". In Vyas, R.T. (ed.). Śilpasaṁvit, Consciousness Manifest, Studies in Jaina Art and Iconography and Allied Subjects in Honour of Dr. U.P. Shah. Vadodara: Oriental Institute.
- F. Mallison (1992). "Muslim Devotional Literature in Gujarati: Islam and Bhakti". In McGregor, R.S. (ed.). Devotional Literature in South Asia, Current Research, 1985-1988. Cambridge: Cambridge University Press.
- F. Mallison (1991). "Lorsque Raṇachoḍarāya quitte Dwarka pour Dakor". In Eck, Diana I.; Mallison, Françoise (eds.). Devotion Divine: Bhakti Traditions from the Regions of India: Studies in Honour of Charlotte Vaudeville (in French). Paris: École française d'Extrême-Orient.
- F. Mallison (1991). "Les chants garabī de Pīr Shams'". In Mallison, Françoise (ed.). Littératures médiévales de l'Inde du Nord: Contributions de Charlotte Vaudeville et de ses élèves. Publications de l'Ecole francaise d'Extreme-Orient (in French). Vol. 165. Paris.
- F. Mallison (1989). "Hinduism as seen by the Nizārī Ismā'īlī Missionaries of Western India: The Evidence of the Ginān". In Sontheimer, Günther=Dietz; Kulke, Hermann (eds.). Hinduism Reconsidered. Heidelberg University South Asian Studies. Vol. 25. South Asia Institute, New Delhi Branch.
- F. Mallison (1986). Au point du jour : les Prabhâtiyâm de Narasimha Mahetâ, poète et saint vishnouite du Gujarât (XVe siècle).
- F. Mallison (1986). "Les chants dhoḷa au gujarāt et leur usage pour la dévotion vallabhite". Bulletin de l'École Française d'Extrême-Orient (in French). 75: 79–103. doi:10.3406/befeo.1986.1701.
- F. Mallison. "The Definition of a Vaiṣṇava according to Medieval Gujarati Devotional Poetry". In Gautam, M.K.; Schokker, G.H. (eds.). Bhakti in Current Research, 1982-1985, Proceedings of the Third International Conference on Devotional Literature in the New Indo-Aryan Languages, Noordwijkerhout 1985. Kern institute Miscellanea. Vol. 10. Lucknow: Indo-European Publication.
- F. Mallison (1983). "Development of early Krishnaism in Gujarāt: Viṣṇu – Raṇchoḍ – Kr̥ṣṇa". In Thiel-Horstmann, Monika (ed.). Bhakti in current research, 1979-1982 : proceedings of the Second International Conference on Early Devotional Literature in New Indo-Aryan Languages, St. Augustin, 19-21 March 1982. Collectanea Instituti Anthropos. Vol. 30. Berlin: Dietrich Reimer Verlag.
- F. Mallison (1980). "The Cult of Sudāmā in Porbandar-Sudāmāpurī". Journal of the Oriental Institute. 29 (3–4). Baroda.
- F. Mallison (1979). "Saint Sudāmā in Gujarat: Should the holy be wealthy?". Journal of the Oriental Institute. 29 (1–2). Baroda.
- F. Mallison (1980). "Bhakti in Gujarat: Some Problems". In Callewaert, Winand M (ed.). Early Hindi Devotional Literature in Current Research, Proceedings of the International Middle Hindi Conference (April 1979) organized by the Katholieke Universiteit Leuven. Orientalia Lovaniensia Analecta 8. Leuven: Departement Orientalistiek Katholieke Universiteit Leuven.
- F. Mallison (1978). "Notes on the Biography of Narasiṁha Mahetā". Annals of the Bhandarkar Oriental Research Institute. 55. Translated by Mallison, Wolfram.
- F. Mallison (1974). "La secte krichnaïte des Svami-narayani au Gujarat". Journal Asiatique. 262.
