= Guy Mallinson =

British furniture designer and craftsman

- Born: Guy Christopher Crosbie Mallinson; December 12, 1963 (age 62)
- Education: Parnham House; Royal College of Art (MA)
- Occupations: Furniture designer, craftsman, educator
- Known for: Green woodworking

Guy Christopher Crosbie Mallinson (born December 1963) is a British furniture designer, craftsman, and educator.

He is known for his work in contemporary woodworking, including the development and architectural application of Bendywood, and for founding Mallinson’s Woodland Retreat in Dorset, home to three RIBA award-winning treehouses. The retreat has also received wider recognition: the Woodsman’s Treehouse was shortlisted for Grand Designs: House of the Year, while Dazzle Treehouse received a VisitEngland Recognition of Service Excellence (ROSE) Award in 2023.

== Early life and education ==
Mallinson trained as a cabinetmaker at Parnham House (The John Makepeace School for Craftsmen in Wood) in Beaminster, Dorset. He then earned a Master of Arts (MA) in Furniture Design from the Royal College of Art (RCA) in London.

== Career ==
Mallinson established Mallinson Ltd in Fulham, London, specializing in bespoke joinery for private and corporate clients, including the headquarters of Walt Disney. During this period, he pioneered the architectural use of Bendywood, a material created through longitudinal compression that allows timber to be bent cold and dry.

His firm was contracted to manufacture the interior timber streetscape for the LABAN Dance Centre, designed by Herzog & de Meuron. The project utilized cold-bending techniques to create fluid, continuous handrails. In 2003, the project won the Stirling Prize, and Mallinson Ltd received the FX International Interior Design Award for Best Public Space Installation.

Mallinson later moved from London to rural Dorset, where he established his Woodland Workshops and focused on green woodworking, using unseasoned timber and traditional hand tools such as axes and pole lathes. At the Woodland Workshops, Mallinson taught carving and green woodworking skills in a woodland setting, including Windsor chair making and bowl carving.

The Woodland Workshops subsequently developed an accommodation element, initially operating as Crafty Camping with yurts, tipis and shepherd’s huts. Mallinson later developed the site as Mallinson’s Woodland Retreat, beginning with the Woodsman’s Treehouse and subsequently adding the Dazzle and Pinwheel treehouses.

== Treehouse Construction ==
Mallinson’s later treehouse projects were designed to minimise disturbance to the surrounding woodland. The structures use steel screw piles rather than conventional concrete foundations, reducing disruption to tree roots. They are also engineered to be structurally independent of the trees around which they are built. Construction makes use of locally sourced materials, including coppiced sweet chestnut, whose natural tannins provide resistance to decay without the need for chemical preservatives.

== Media and television ==
- Mastercrafts (BBC Two): In 2010, Mallinson appeared as the expert "Wood Mentor" in the premiere episode, teaching green woodworking techniques.
- George Clarke's Amazing Spaces (Channel 4): Documented the construction of "The Woodsman’s Treehouse" (Series 6, Episode 1).
- Grand Designs House of the Year (Channel 4): Featured Mallinson Woodland Retreat. (Series 3, Episode 3)
- World's Most Secret Hotels (Channel 4): Featured Mallinson Woodland Retreat. (Series 2, Episode 2)

== Arboreal architecture ==
Mallinson collaborated with architect Keith Brownlie and BEAM on the three treehouses at Mallinson’s Woodland Retreat: the Woodsman’s Treehouse, Dazzle and Pinwheel. In 2025, planning permission was granted for five additional treehouses at Mallinson’s Woodland Retreat.

Structure	Completed	Recognition	Features
The Woodsman's Treehouse	2016	RIBA South West Award (2017); RIBA Small Project of the Year (2017)	Built around a 200-year-old oak; features a copper bath and a stainless steel slide.
Dazzle Treehouse	2020	RIBA South West Award (2023)	Exterior design based on WWI "Dazzle" naval camouflage.
Pinwheel Treehouse	2020	RIBA South West Award (2023)	A glass-topped living space with radiating rooms.
