= VisitEngland =

Tourist board for England

- Industry: Tourism
- Founded: 2009 (relaunch)
- Headquarters: Victoria Square House, Birmingham
- Key people: Victoria Borwick (chair)
- Owner: VisitBritain
- Website: visitengland.com

VisitEngland is the official tourist board for England. It is run by the British Tourist Authority, which also runs VisitBritain, with its stated mission is to "build England's tourism product, raise Britain's profile worldwide, increase the volume and value of tourism exports and develop England and Britain's visitor economy".

== History ==
Before 1999 it was known as the English Tourist Board and between 1999 and 2009 as the English Tourism Council. In 2003, it was absorbed into the British Tourist Authority and was relaunched as a separate body again in 2009.

In 2023, VisitEngland and VisitBritain started negotiations for office space in Birmingham. Citing the reason for this move from London was for Birmingham's good office space and large number of talented workers.

== Quality assessment schemes ==
The VisitEngland accommodation assessment schemes were run under licence by Quality in Tourism from 2012 to 2017, when the AA took on the license. The scheme issues quality awards to holiday accommodation, hotel, bed and breakfast, self catering holiday cottages and others.

== Symbols ==
English tourist attraction symbol

== See also ==
- Tourism in England
- VisitBritain
- Tourism Northern Ireland
- VisitScotland
- Visit Wales
