= Tourism Northern Ireland =

Northern Ireland tourism organisation

- Industry: Tourism
- Area served: Northern Ireland
- Parent: Department for the Economy
- Website: www.tourismni.com

Tourism Northern Ireland, also known as Tourism NI, is a non-departmental public body of the Department for the Economy. Its primary objective is to promote Northern Ireland as a tourist destination to domestic tourists, from within Northern Ireland, and to visitors from the Republic of Ireland.

It provides a service to the public for information on tourist destinations within Northern Ireland, public transport, accommodation, and the various tourist attractions throughout Northern Ireland.

It was established in 1948 as part of the Development of Tourist Traffic Act (NI), and its remit was affirmed by the Tourism (NI) Order 1992. In 2015, its name was changed from the Northern Ireland Tourist Board (NITB; Irish: Bord Turasóireachta Thuaisceart Éireann; Ulster-Scots: Norlin Airlann Reengin Boord) to Tourism Northern Ireland as part of the wider review of the public body. As of 31 March 2018, Tourism NI employed 143 people.

Tourism Northern Ireland operates in close cooperation with equivalent agencies in the rest of the United Kingdom and Fáilte Ireland in the Republic of Ireland. The cross-border body Tourism Ireland (formed in 1999) is responsible for attracting overseas tourists to the island of Ireland.

== Governance ==
The Chairman and Board Members are appointed for a three-year term by the Minister for the Economy; they ensure the body fulfils the objectives set by the department and its public remit. The Chief Executive is responsible for safeguarding public funds and the operational management of Tourism NI. The Senior Management Team is responsible for deciding the strategic direction of the organisation to ensure the aims and objectives of the Corporate and Operating Plans are achieved.

- Terence Brannigan – Chairman Tourism NI Board
- John McGrillen – Chief Executive

== See also ==
- List of Government departments and agencies in Northern Ireland
- VisitBritain
