= Tourism Ireland =

All-Ireland Tourist agency, formed 1999

State agency overview
- Formed: 1999
- Jurisdiction: Northern Ireland and Republic of Ireland
- Headquarters: Dublin, Republic of Ireland & Coleraine, Northern Ireland
- State agency executive: Niall Gibbons (CEO)
- Website: www.tourismireland.com

Tourism Ireland (Irish: Turasóireacht Éireann; Ulster-Scots: Tourism Airlan or Reengin Airlann) is the marketing body responsible for marketing the island of Ireland overseas. Tourism Ireland was established as one of "six areas of co-operation" under the framework of the 1998 Belfast Agreement and became operational in January 2002.

Tourism Ireland operates under the auspices of the North/South Ministerial Council through the Department for the Economy in Northern Ireland and the Department of Enterprise, Tourism and Employment in the Republic of Ireland.

Tourism Ireland’s Board of Directors is appointed by the North South Ministerial Council and represents tourism industry interests on the island of Ireland. The current Directors' terms expire in December 2021.

Niall Gibbons was appointed as the second Chief Executive of the organisation, replacing the founding CEO Paul O'Toole, in June 2009. The remaining members of the senior management are Siobhan McManamy who is Director of Markets, Mark Henry who is Central Marketing Director, and Shane Clarke who is Director of Corporate Services.

Tourism Ireland's headquarters are located in Dublin and Coleraine, and also has 15 offices across Europe, North America, the Middle East, China and Australia, as well as having representatives in India and New Zealand. The island of Ireland (which includes both the Republic of Ireland and Northern Ireland) received a record 11.3 million visitors during 2019. Approximately 40% of visitors come from Great Britain, 18% from North America and 35% from Mainland Europe.

== Online ==
Tourism Ireland maintains a corporate domain name, tourismireland.com, providing business guidance, advocacy and support to tourism companies in Ireland.

In 2012, it acquired the domain name ireland.com from The Irish Times, for €495,000. The newspaper focused on its existing (established in 2008) irishtimes.com domain name thereafter, while Tourism Ireland setup ireland.com as its consumer website, providing direct contact for tourists looking to visit Ireland.

== See also ==
- Fáilte Ireland
- Tourism Northern Ireland
