= List of regions of Hungary =

There are eight statistical regions of Hungary, These regions consist of the 19 Counties of Hungary and the capital city. There were seven regions created in 1999 by the Law 1999/XCII amending Law 1996/XXI but since 2018 the capital Budapest has left the Central Hungary region and become its own region.

Regions of Hungary
Name of the region	Regional centre	Area (km^{2})	Population	Density (/km^{2})
Northern Hungary (Észak-Magyaroszág)	Miskolc	13,426	1,102,064	82
Northern Great Plain (Észak-Alföld)	Debrecen	17,723	1,423,751	80
Southern Great Plain (Dél-Alföld)	Szeged	18,336	1,213,595	66
Budapest (Budapest)	[n.a.]	510	1,706,851	3,347
Central Hungary (Közép-Magyarország)	Budapest	6,281	1,325,036	211
Central Transdanubia (Közép-Dunántúl)	Székesfehérvár	11,329	1,060,703	94
Western Transdanubia (Nyugat-Dunántúl)	Győr	11,086	983,933	89
Southern Transdanubia (Dél-Dunántúl)	Pécs	14,197	900,868	63

- Northern Hungary includes the counties Borsod-Abaúj-Zemplén, Heves and Nógrád.
- Northern Great Plain includes the counties Hajdú-Bihar, Jász-Nagykun-Szolnok, and Szabolcs-Szatmár-Bereg.
- Southern Great Plain includes the counties Bács-Kiskun, Békés and Csongrád-Csanád.
- Central Hungary includes the county of Pest.
- Budapest includes the capital Budapest.
- Central Transdanubia includes the counties Komárom-Esztergom, Fejér and Veszprém.
- Western Transdanubia includes the counties Győr-Moson-Sopron, Vas, Zala.
- Southern Transdanubia includes the counties Baranya, Somogy and Tolna.

== Euroregions ==
Hungary belongs into the following euroregions:

- Carpathian Euroregion: Borsod-Abaúj-Zemplén, Szabolcs-Szatmár-Bereg, Hajdú-Bihar, Jász-Nagykun-Szolnok, Heves
- West Pannonia Euroregion: Győr-Moson-Sopron, Vas, Zala
- Danube-Drava-Sava: Baranya
- Danube-Kris-Mures-Tisza (DKMT): Bács-Kiskun, Békés, Csongrád-Csanád, Jász-Nagykun-Szolnok
- Ister-Granum Euroregion: Komárom-Esztergom, Nógrád

(Counties sometimes only roughly correspond to euroregions, so overlap is possible.)

== See also ==
- Counties of Hungary
- Districts of Hungary (from 2013)
  - Subregions of Hungary (until 2013)
- Administrative divisions of the Kingdom of Hungary (until 1918)
  - Counties of the Kingdom of Hungary
- Administrative divisions of the Kingdom of Hungary (1941–44)
- List of cities and towns of Hungary
- NUTS:HU
- Region (Europe)
- Nomenclature of Territorial Units for Statistics
