= Cieszyn Silesia Euroregion =

Euroregion between Poland and Czech Republic

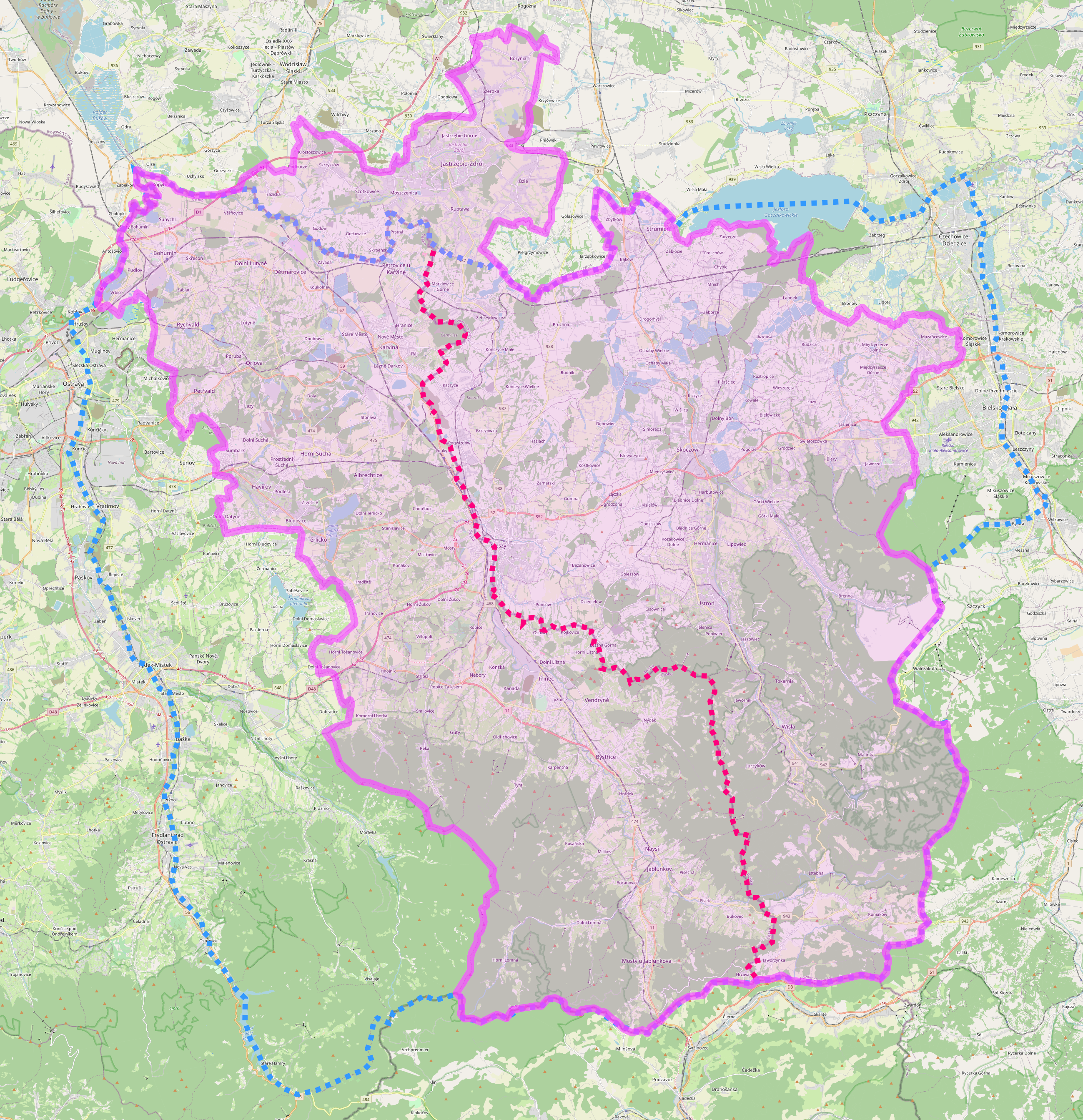
Cieszyn Silesia Euroregion (pink) compared to the historical borders of Cieszyn Silesia (blue dotted line)

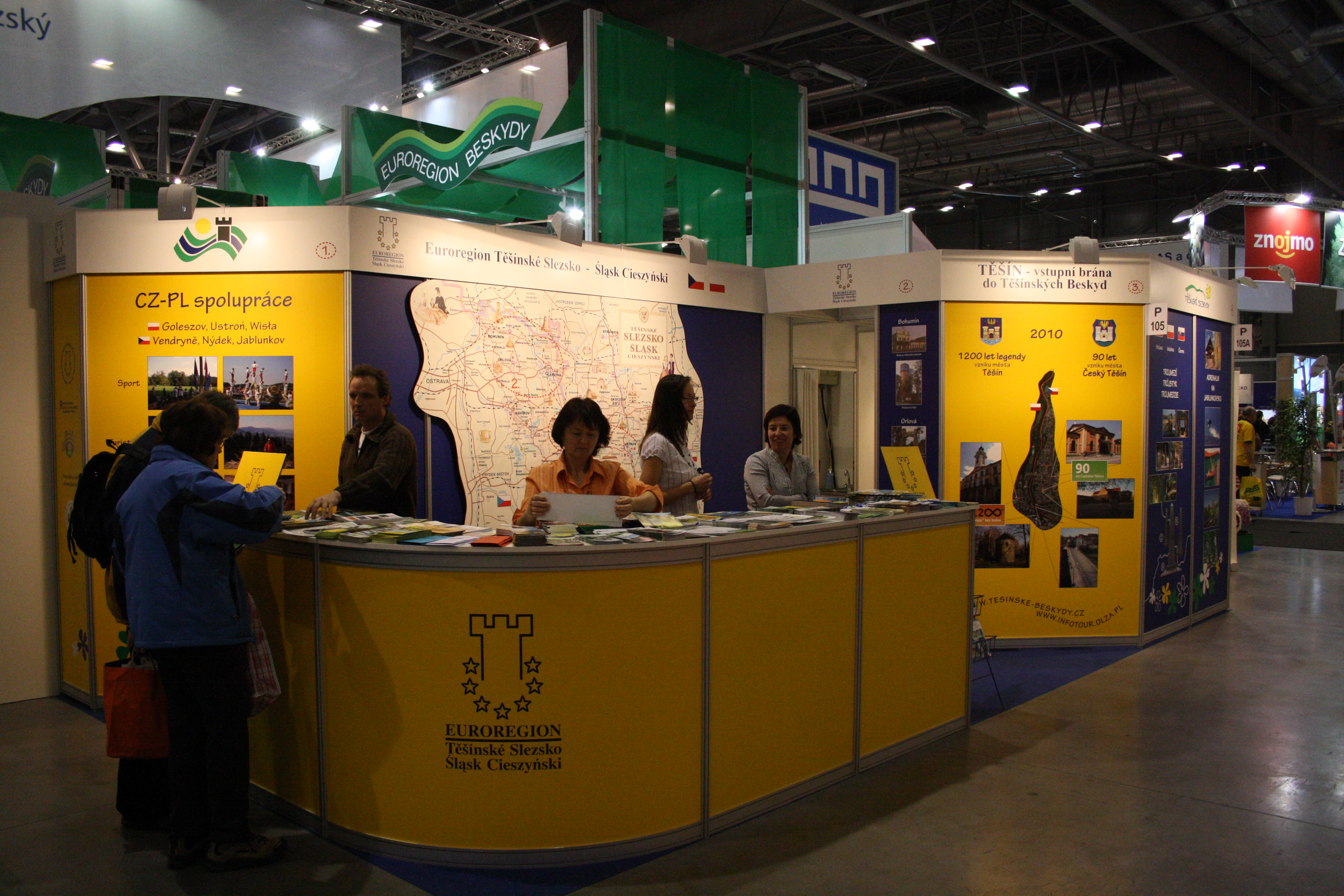
Presentation of the Euroregion in Brno (2010)

Euroregion Cieszyn Silesia (Polish: Euroregion Śląsk Cieszyński, Czech: Euroregion Těšínské Slezsko) is one of the euroregions (transnational co-operation structures) between Poland and Czech Republic. It has area of 1,741.34 km^{2} and 658,224 inhabitants as of 2009. The largest cities are Jastrzębie-Zdrój from Polish side and Havířov from Czech side. It was established on 22 April 1998.

It comprises a large part of the historical region of Cieszyn Silesia:

- in Poland: 12 municipalities of the Cieszyn County, 2 municipalities of the Bielsko County (Jaworze and Jasienica), 1 municipality in Wodzisław County (Godów) and Jastrzębie-Zdrój (however, the last two are not part of Cieszyn Silesia).
- in the Czech Republic: 16 municipalities of the Karviná District and 27 municipalities in the eastern part of the Frýdek-Místek District.

Not the whole area of the historical Cieszyn Silesia region belongs to the euroregion, mainly Bielsko and Czechowice-Dziedzice and Frýdek with its surroundings, east of the Ostravice river, which belong to the Euroregion Beskydy.

== Strategic goals of Euroregion ==
- wide development of the region
- exchange of experience and information
- support for culture, education and sport in the region
- development of regional transport infrastructure
- improvement of the security of citizens
- tourism development
- cooperation between schools and support for ecological initiatives

== See also ==
- Olza (river)
- Czantoria Wielka
- Godów, Silesian Voivodeship
