= Euroregion Baltic =

Euroregion of Denmark, Lithuania, Poland, Russia and Sweden

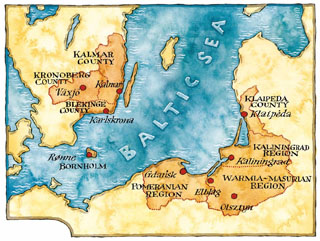
- ERB Member Regions
- Abbreviation: ERB
- Formation: 1998
- Type: Euroregion
- Headquarters: Elbląg, Poland
- Region served: South Baltic Sea
- Official language: English, Russian
- President: Per Ole Petersen
- Vice President: Vytautas Grubliauskas
- Website: euroregionbaltic.eu

The Euroregion Baltic (ERB) refers to a cross-border Euroregion in the south-east of the Baltic Sea Region, consisting of eight regions of Denmark, Lithuania, Poland, Russia, and Sweden. On 2 March 2022, the ERB's Executive Board suspended Russia's membership, in response to Russia's invasion of Ukraine.

The ERB was the first Euroregion to formally include a partner from Russia through its inclusion of the Kaliningrad Oblast (a Russian exclave). It comprises regions from both old and new member states of the European Union.

== History ==
The idea of establishing the Euroregion Baltic was developed in the mid-1990s by local politicians and entrepreneurs from south-east Sweden and north-east Poland. Organizational works started at an international conference held in Malbork between 28 Feb – 1 March 1997. The representatives of regions participating in the conference decided to establish the Organizational Committee, whose task was to lay the foundations of the future Euroregion. The working name of the Euroregion was "Jantar" or "Amber", but it was later changed to "Baltic", as it underlined common cultural and historical heritage as well as geographical location of the participating regions.

The Committee convened for the first time on 17 November 1997. On 22 February 1998 in Malbork, Poland, the Agreement on Establishing the Euroregion 'Baltic' was signed by representatives of regions from six countries including: the Bornholm County (Denmark), Liepāja (Latvia), Klaipėda County, cities of Klaipėda, Palanga and Neringa (Lithuania), Elbląg, Gdańsk, Słupsk and Olsztyn provinces, (Poland), representatives of the Association of Municipalities of Kaliningrad Region (Russia), Blekinge City and Kalmar County and Kronoberg County (Sweden).

The first ERB conference on strategy took place in Brussels on 11 June 2008 and was attended by representatives of the European Parliament, Swedish Government, DG Regio, Committee of the Regions, Baltic Development Forum, ScanBalt, Helsinki Commission and Baltic Sea Chambers of Commerce Association. The participants had the opportunity to hear about the Strategy in more detail while it was still being developed and contribute to the process with their views.

On 20 November 2008 the Euroregion Baltic Council adopted a position on the EU Strategy for the Baltic Sea Region in which it welcomed and supported its main objectives.

After Russia attacked Ukraine on 24 February 2022, Kaliningrad has been excluded from cooperation in the region.

== Member regions ==
Currently the Euroregion Baltic's active membership consists of seven regions from four countries; additionally, Russia's Kaliningrad region is a suspended member.

Region	Sovereign state	Land area (km^{2})	Population	GDP (MEUR)	Unemployment (%)	PPP per inhabitant (%)
Blekinge	Sweden	2 947	151 900	4 958	5.9	110.9
Bornholm	Denmark	588	42 913	1 331	9.0	90.3
Kalmar	Sweden	11 219	233 834	7 113	5.6	103.2
Kaliningrad (suspended)	Russia	15 125	937 353	4 054	10.7	–
Klaipėda	Lithuania	5 209	378 843	3 280	7.2	60.6
Pomerania	Poland	18 293	2 210 920	17 727	6.4	54
Kronoberg	Sweden	8 467	180 787	6 094	4.7	106.7
Warmia–Masuria	Poland	24 192	1 426 155	8 657	8.5	41

== Organisational structure ==
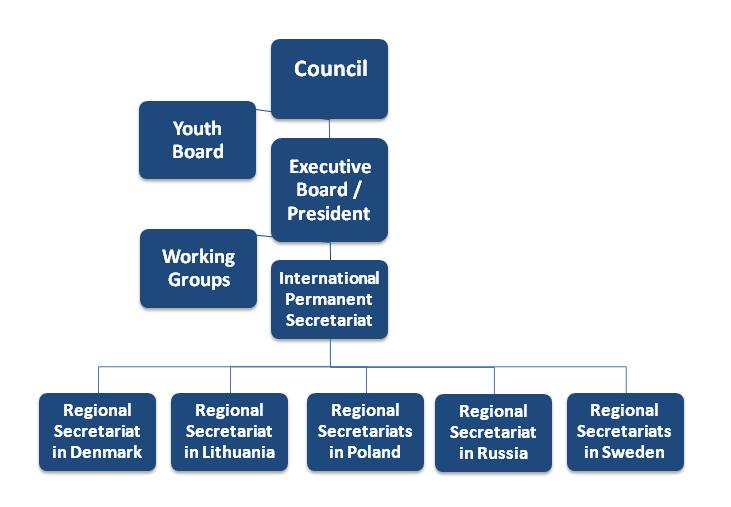
ERB structure prior to the 2010 reform

Following the implementation of the strategic review of ERB cooperation, the organisational structure has been significantly reformed in order for the ERB to be able to fulfil the new objectives set out by the ERB 2020 Agenda. Therefore, the decision was made to dissolve the ERB Council which for more than 12 years had been the highest legislative body within the Euroregion. According to the previous ERB Statutes, the Council consisted of up to eight representatives appointed by each Party of the Agreement and all the members of the Youth Board. The Council debated in sessions while its decisions were based on consensus. Apart from the Council, the ERB member regions decided to dissolve all Working Groups and replace them with ad hoc Task Forces. Currently four ERB Task Forces are being operational. As a result of the introduction of the new organisational structure, ERB should become more flexible, effective and quicker to take decisions and capable of taking strategic actions.

=== Executive Board ===
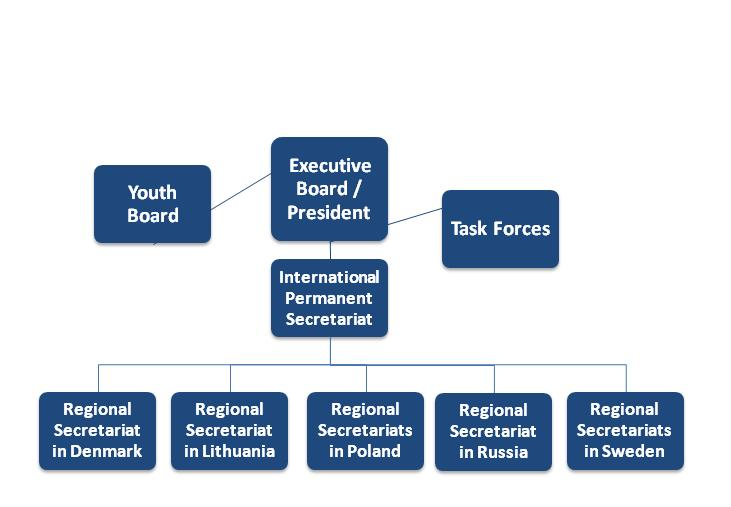
Current organisational structure of ERB

Since 29 October 2010 the Executive Board of the Euroregion Baltic is the highest decision-making body of the organisation. According to the new Statutes adopted by Council on that day, the Executive Board consists of up to two representatives of the highest possible political rank and one permanent deputy nominated by each member organisation and the Chairperson of the Youth Board. The Board debates during formal meetings which may be ordinary or extraordinary. The meetings are held in English and in public unless the Board decides otherwise. Ordinary meetings must take place at least three times a year and they are summoned by the ERB President. Extraordinary meetings may take place at any time decided upon by the Board. Decisions of the Board are based on consensus and each member organisation as well as the Chair of the Youth Board all have one vote. The Board has the right to initiate and adopt changes to the ERB Statutes; prepare and approve long-term programmes, biennial actions plans and other strategic documents; prepare, adopt and implement resolutions, joint statements and positions; elect ERB President and Vice-President; approve annual activity reports from the ERB President; approve annual activity and financial reports from the International Permanent Secretariat and the Youth Board; decide on enlarging of the ERB territory and approve withdrawal or suspension of the Parties; establish ad hoc task forces; confer the title of the ERB honorary membership.

The Executive Board also initiates the organisation of the ERB Annual Forum of Stakeholders. The idea of the Forum, which is not a decision-making body, is to create a meeting platform facilitating discussion of relevant stakeholders from member organisations. The Forum is the arena for presenting opinions and interests of all ERB stakeholders such as member organisations, local communities, authorities, and also representatives of external organisations (leading politicians and high-ranking civil servants, national and EU representatives, experts and practitioners of territorial cooperation). The main goal of the Forum is to discuss important issues related to the ERB cooperation, in particular those concerning the European Union, Baltic Sea Region or EU – Russia relations. The Forum is responsible for formulating general recommendations for the ERB cooperation which then can be taken into account by the Executive Board.

=== President ===
The President of Euroregion Baltic chairs the meetings of the Executive Board and is the highest representative of the Euroregion. The President is authorised by the Executive Board to represent ERB externally and act on its behalf. As the Chair of the Executive Board, the President is assisted by the International Permanent Secretariat and ERB regional secretariats. The ERB Presidency and Vice-Presidency are held for one year and it rotates around all of the National Parties of the ERB cooperation who subsequently recommend their candidates to be finally approved by the ERB Executive Board.

Previous ERB Presidencies:

- 2011: Russian presidency, and Swedish vice-presidency
- 2012: Swedish presidency, and Danish vice-presidency
- 2013: Danish presidency, and Lithuanian vice-presidency
- 2014: Lithuanian presidency, and Polish vice-presidency
- 2015: Polish presidency, and Russian vice-presidency
- 2016: Russian presidency, and Swedish vice-presidency
- 2017: Swedish presidency, and Danish vice-presidency
- 2018: Danish presidency, and Lithuanian vice-presidency
- 2019: Lithuanian presidency, and Polish vice-presidency
- 2020: Polish presidency, and Russian vice-presidency
- 2021: Swedish presidency, and Polish vice-presidency
- 2022: Polish presidency, and Danish vice-presidency
- 2023: Danish presidency, and Swedish vice-presidency

=== International Permanent Secretariat (IPS) and Regional Secretariats ===
The ERB International Permanent Secretariat and Regional Secretariats are administrative bodies of the Euroregion which are responsible for daily management and coordination of ERB cooperation. The IPS is responsible for submitting periodical financial reports to the Board; assisting the President in submitting to the Board annual activity and financial reports; assisting the President and Vice-President in submitting to the Board the biennial action plan of the ERB cooperation; keeping regular contacts with Regional Secretariats; maintaining close working relations with the member organisations; preparing meetings for the Board; maintaining internal and external correspondence and conducting promotion and information dissemination activities. The IPS is currently hosted by the Regional Council of Southern Småland which is seated in Växjö, Sweden. Regional Secretariats are established in each ERB member organisation and serve as a liaison between the International Permanent Secretariat and member organisations.

== Main focus areas ==
In 2010 ERB has undergone a strategic review of cooperation which resulted in a series of new documents outlining new objectives and focus areas. According to the revised ERB Statutes, the main goals of ERB is to undertake joint initiatives aiming at strengthening and promoting cooperation among the local and regional authorities within ERB, as well as contributing to the sustainable development of the Baltic Sea Region, with particular attention to the South Baltic area. The Euroregion also represents and promotes common interests of its member organisations and acts on their behalf towards the national, European and international institutions, and is responsible for implementing strategic initiatives complementing local and regional agendas of the member organisations, and pursuing organised exchange activities.

=== Lobbying activities ===
Lobbying activities aim at strengthening ERB lobbying activities towards the European Union and taking an active role in the shaping of EU policies such as EU Cohesion Policy, EU Strategy for the Baltic Sea Region, Europe 2020 Strategy, TEN-T Policy, Rural Development Policy, EU – Russia Cooperation and Eastern Partnership. These activities are initiated by the Executive Board which is authorised to established dedicated ad hoc task forces responsible for planning and executing lobbying activities. In achieving these goals, ERB cooperates closely with the European Commission, European Parliament, Committee of the Regions, national governments, Baltic organisations, as well as with the regional offices in Brussels.

In order to facilitate the successful implementation of the lobbying activities, on 28 October 2010 ERB Council decided to create three ad hoc task forces. The Task Force on EU Cohesion Policy is responsible for monitoring the preparation of future EU Cohesion Policy and will actively promote a greater role of its objective 3 – European Territorial Cooperation. The Task Force on the EU Strategy for the Baltic Sea Region will be analysing the current implementation of the Strategy and prepare a draft position on the Strategy's review process and including a lobby plan. Finally, the Task Force on the Annual Forum of ERB Stakeholders is in charge of preparing and organising the Annual Forum in 2011.

=== Strategic actions ===
This focus area ERB is designed to upgrade the added value of cooperation by enabling networking among ERB partners and providing complementarity with the regional development strategies. It also aims at strengthening the vitality of ERB cooperation through involving high political representatives of the regions and other important stakeholders. The ERB 2020 Agenda sets out three strategic objectives within this area:

- implementation of ERB Joint Development Programme,
- accomplishment of prioritised institutional activities,
- development of platforms supporting other forms of cooperation and actors in the ERB area.

The ERB Joint Development Programme is an important element of ERB cooperation. It continues to be implemented by the organisation. Under the new guidelines, each partners of ERB cooperation will define which JDP actions shall be selected for realisation. Currently, the organisation provides support to the ERB Water Forum and assists the Pomorskie region in its efforts to resubmit the BaltNet project to the South Baltic Cross-border Cooperation Programme.

The second objective includes the investigation of a possible status of a European Grouping of Territorial Cooperation (EGTC) on the condition that it covers all the ERB partners and aims at involving more intensively experts in the our work with the long-term objective of building a think-tank capacity of Euroregion Baltic. Within this objective ERB also supports the Youth Board in developing a flagship project proposal to the EU Strategy for the Baltic Sea Region.

With regards to the third objective, ERB will mainly support the development of other platforms of cooperation by serving as a match-making point and information broker in such areas as the triple-helix cooperation, labour mobility, maritime safety, environmental protection and energy saving, promotion of investments in transport infrastructure and facilitating border crossing with the Kaliningrad Region.

=== Exchange activities ===
These activities aim at deepening relations between the ERB member regions and strengthening cooperation through a collaborative approach to common problems. The exchange activities include: maintaining continuous exchange of information for the benefit of ERB members, gathering and disseminating information about existing Baltic initiatives, taking actions aiming at deepening relations between ERB communities; collecting information on the needs of communes and local communities regarding cross-border cooperation and the existing resources of this cooperation.

== See also ==
- Euroregion
- List of euroregions
- Baltic region
- European Grouping for Territorial Cooperation
