= Alps–Mediterranean Euroregion =

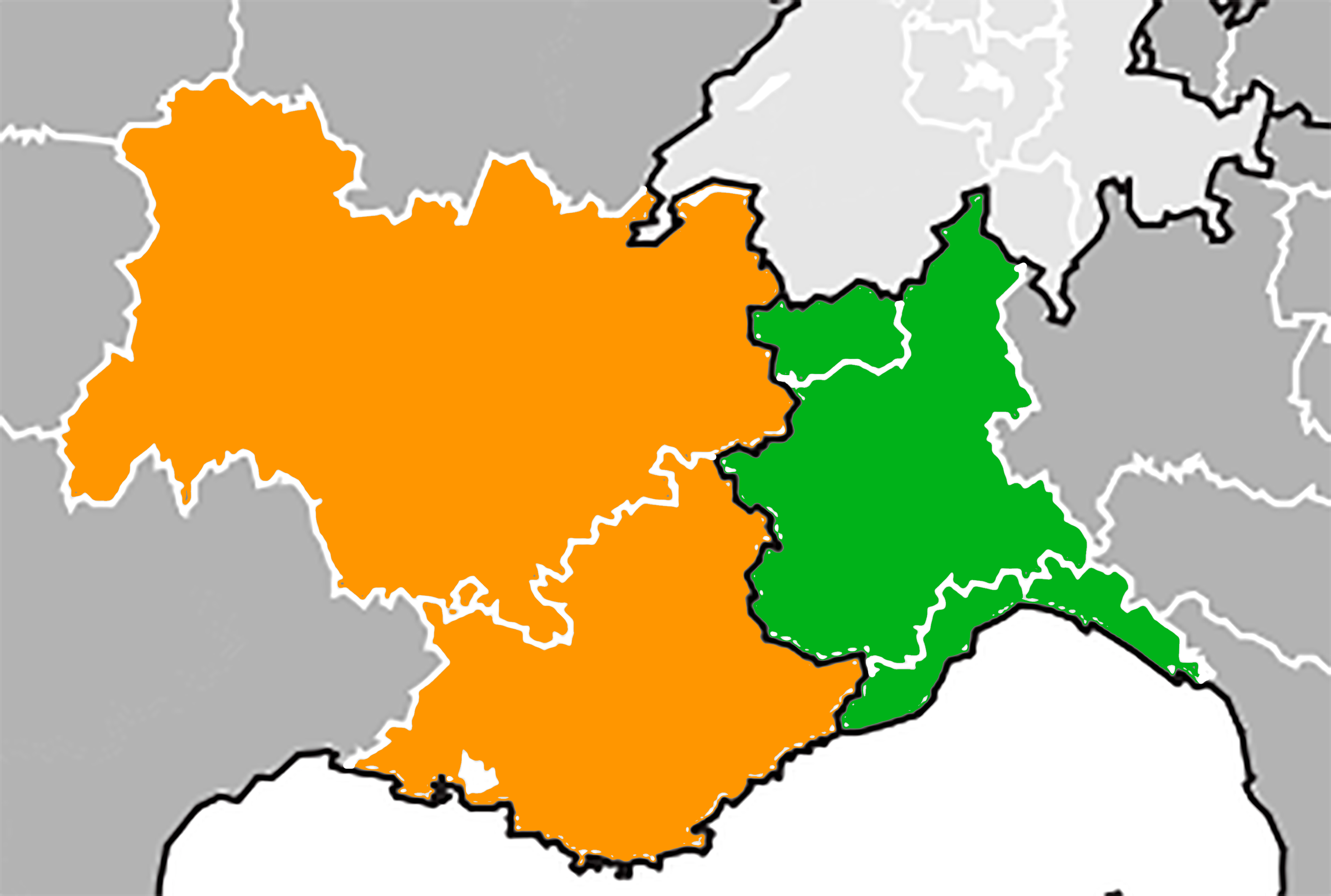

The Alps–Mediterranean Euroregion (transnational co-operation structure) was created on 10 July 2007 between three Italian regions (Piedmont, Liguria and Aosta Valley) and two French regions (Rhône-Alpes and Provence-Alpes-Côte d'Azur). It has an area of about 110,460 km^{2} and more than 17 million inhabitants. The largest Italian cities are Turin and Genoa and the largest French cities are Lyon, Marseille and Nice near Monaco.

== Map ==
Alps-Mediterranean Euroregion's map
