= Adriatic Ionian Euroregion =

Counties bordering the Adriatic and Ionian Seas

- Sign and symbol
- Type: Euroregion
- Membership: 33 local authorities of Albania, Bosnia and Herzegovina, Croatia, Italy, Montenegro and Greece

The Adriatic Ionian Euroregion is a Euroregion comprising countries and their subdivisions bordering the Adriatic and Ionian Sea. The president of the organization is Nikola Dobroslavić, President of the Region of Dubrovnik. The Euroregion is formally established as a nonprofit organization according to the law of Croatia.

The Adriatic Euroregion was founded on 30 June 2006 in Pula, Region of Istria, Croatia. The association changed its statutory name Adriatic Ionian Euroregion in January 2013.

It represents a model of co-operation that includes trans-national and inter-regional co-operation between regions of the Adriatic and Ionian coastline.

The Adriatic Ionian Euroregion is the institutional framework for jointly defining and solving important issues across the maritime local areas bordering the Adriatic and Ionian seas.

The aims of the AIE are the following:

- Forming an area of peace, stability and co-operation
- Protection of the cultural heritage
- Protection of the environment
- Sustainable economic development in particular of tourism, fishery and agriculture
- Solution of transport and other infrastructure issues

== Members ==
In green, the member regions (28 in 2006); in lighter green, the other territories of the interested countries.

As of August 2023, the Euroregion consists of 33 member regional and local governments (NUTS 2 or NUTS 3 subdivisions) from 6 interested countries:

- 6 counties in Albania:
  - Durrës (since 30 June 2006)
  - Fier (since 30 June 2006)
  - Lezhë (since 30 June 2006)
  - Shkodër (since 30 June 2006)
  - Tirana (since 30 June 2006)
  - Vlorë (since 30 June 2006)
- 4 cantons in Bosnia and Herzegovina:
  - Herzeg-Bosnian (Canton 10) (since 8 February 2018)
  - Herzegovina-Neretva (since 30 June 2006)
  - Una-Sana (since 8 February 2018)
  - West Herzegovina (since ?)
- 7 counties in Croatia:
  - Dubrovnik-Neretva (since 30 June 2006)
  - Istria (since 30 June 2006)
  - Lika and Senj (since 30 June 2006)
  - Primorje and Gorski Kotar (since ?)
  - Šibenik and Knin (since 30 June 2006)
  - Split and Dalmatia (since 30 June 2006)
  - Zadar (since 30 June 2006)
- 2 regions in Greece:
  - Epirus (since ?)
  - Ionian Islands (since ?)
- 8 regions in Italy:
  - Abruzzo (since 30 June 2006)
  - Apulia (since 30 June 2006)
  - Calabria (since 8 February 2018)
  - Emilia-Romagna (since 30 June 2006)
  - Friuli-Venezia Giulia (autonomous region) (since 30 June 2006)
  - Marche (since 30 June 2006)
  - Molise (since 30 June 2006)
  - Veneto (since 30 June 2006)
- 6 municipalities in Montenegro:
  - Budva (since 8 February 2018)
  - Cetinje (Old Royal Capital) (since 2015)
  - Herceg Novi (since 21 September 2015)
  - Kotor (since 30 June 2006)
  - Tivat (since ?)
  - Ulcinj (since ?)

The Euroregion formerly included 3 other members from 1 country:

- 3 municipalities in Slovenia:
  - Izola (30 June 2006–?)
  - Koper (urban municipality) (?–?)
  - Piran (?–?)
