= Euroregion Elbe/Labe =

Cross-border co-operation institution

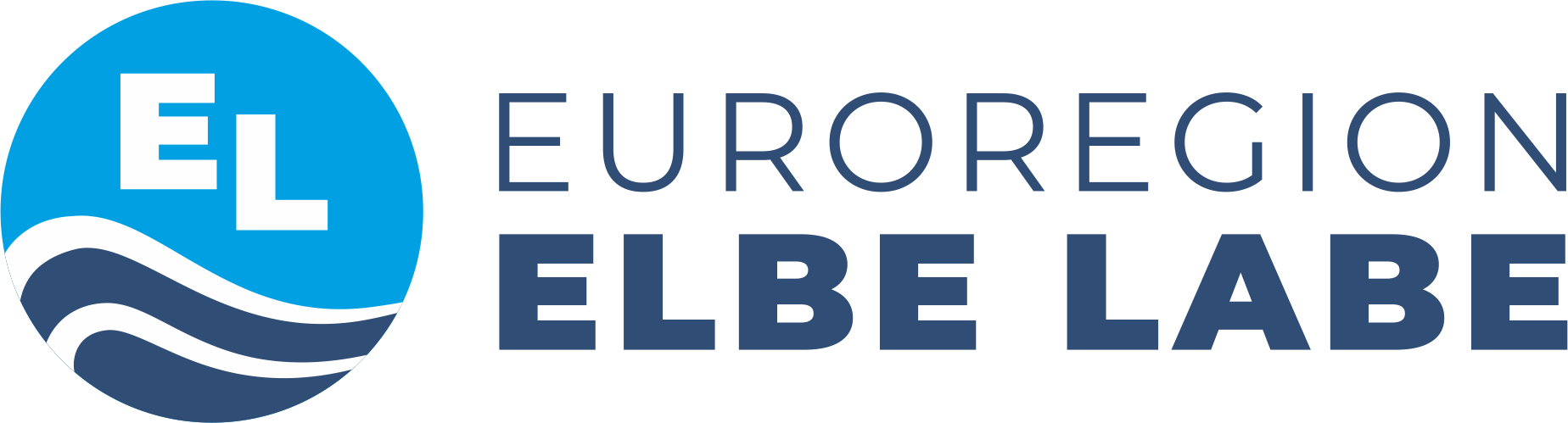
Logo of Euroregion Elbe/Labe

The Euroregion Elbe/Labe is one of the Euroregions with German and Czech participation. The purpose of the community of municipal interests is cross-border cooperation on a supranational level. The term is used to refer to both the organization and the geographical area of its operation.

== Area and location ==
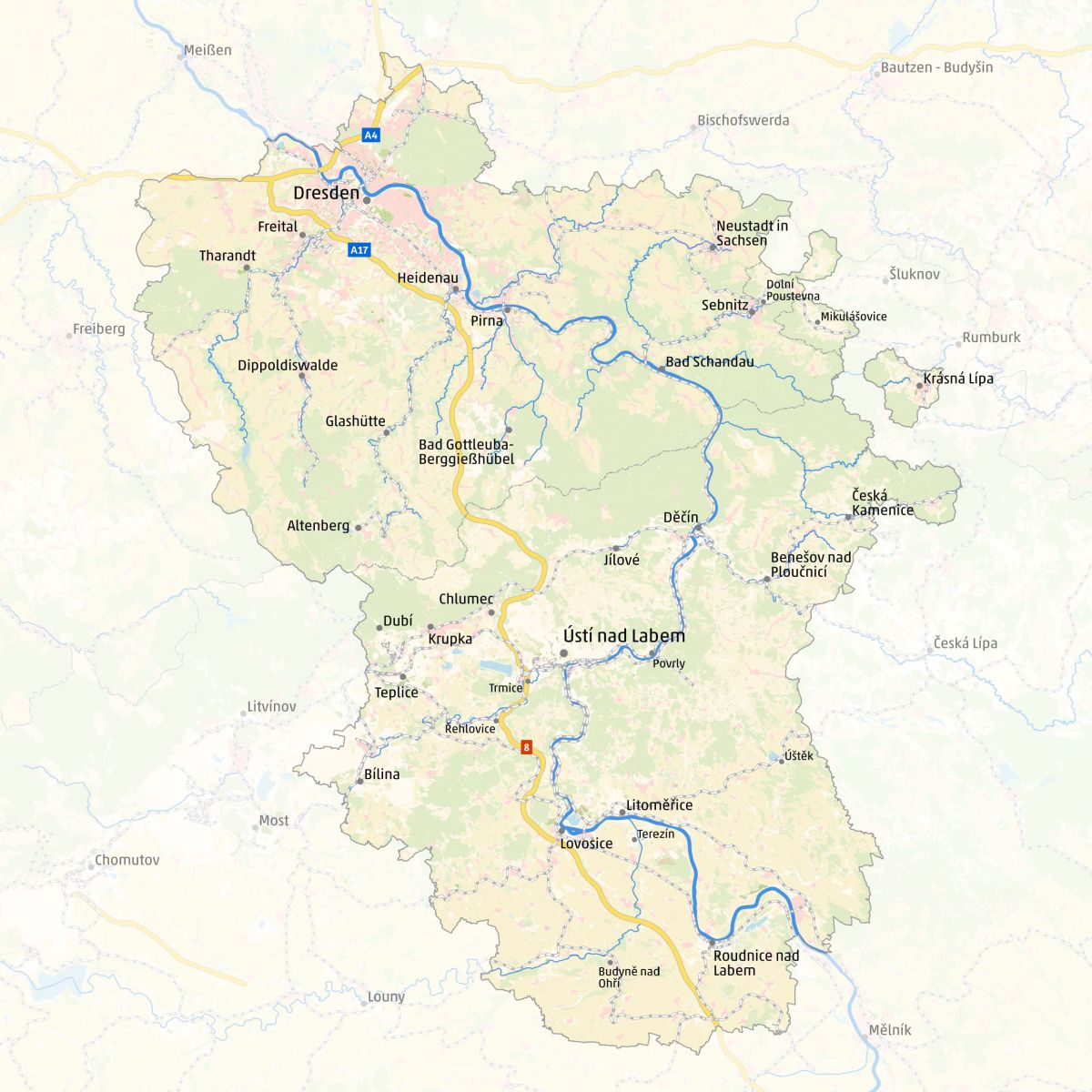
Map of the area of Euroregion Elbe/Labe (non-members at the edges are excluded)

The territory of the Euroregion Elbe/Labe includes on the German side the city of Dresden and the county of Sächsische Schweiz-Osterzgebirge, on the Czech side the territories of the former districts of Teplice, Ústí nad Labem, Děčín and Litoměřice.

== Organization ==
The Euroregion Elbe/Labe as an organization is itself not a legal entity, but a cross-border community of interests, consisting of the Municipal association Euroregion Upper Elbe Valley-Eastern Erzgebirge (Kommunalgemeinschaft Euroregion Oberes Elbtal/Osterzgebirge e.V.) and the Voluntary Association of Municipalities Euroregion Labe (Dobrovolní svazek obce Euroregion Labe).

== History ==
The Elbe/Labe Euroregion was founded on June 24, 1992 in Ústí nad Labem. The driving force behind the foundation was the then Primator of the city of Ústí nad Labem, Lukaš Mašin, whose initiative was taken up on the German side mainly by the District Administrator of the Pirna District, Hans-Jürgen Evers.

== Euroregion projects ==
In the first years, the Euroregion was mainly concerned with initiating contacts between Saxon and Czech actors in order to promote cooperation in solving common challenges in areas such as environmental and nature protection, transport and infrastructure or tourism. The Euroregion was involved in a supportive way e.g. in the establishment of the Bilingual Friedrich-Schiller-Gymnasium Pirna, the Cross-border Mining Trail in the Upper Eastern Ore Mountains, the ferry connection between Schöna and Hřensko as well as the bus line from Dresden to Teplice.

== See also ==
List of euroregions
