= Euroregion Bug =

Euroregion in Belarus, Poland, and Ukraine

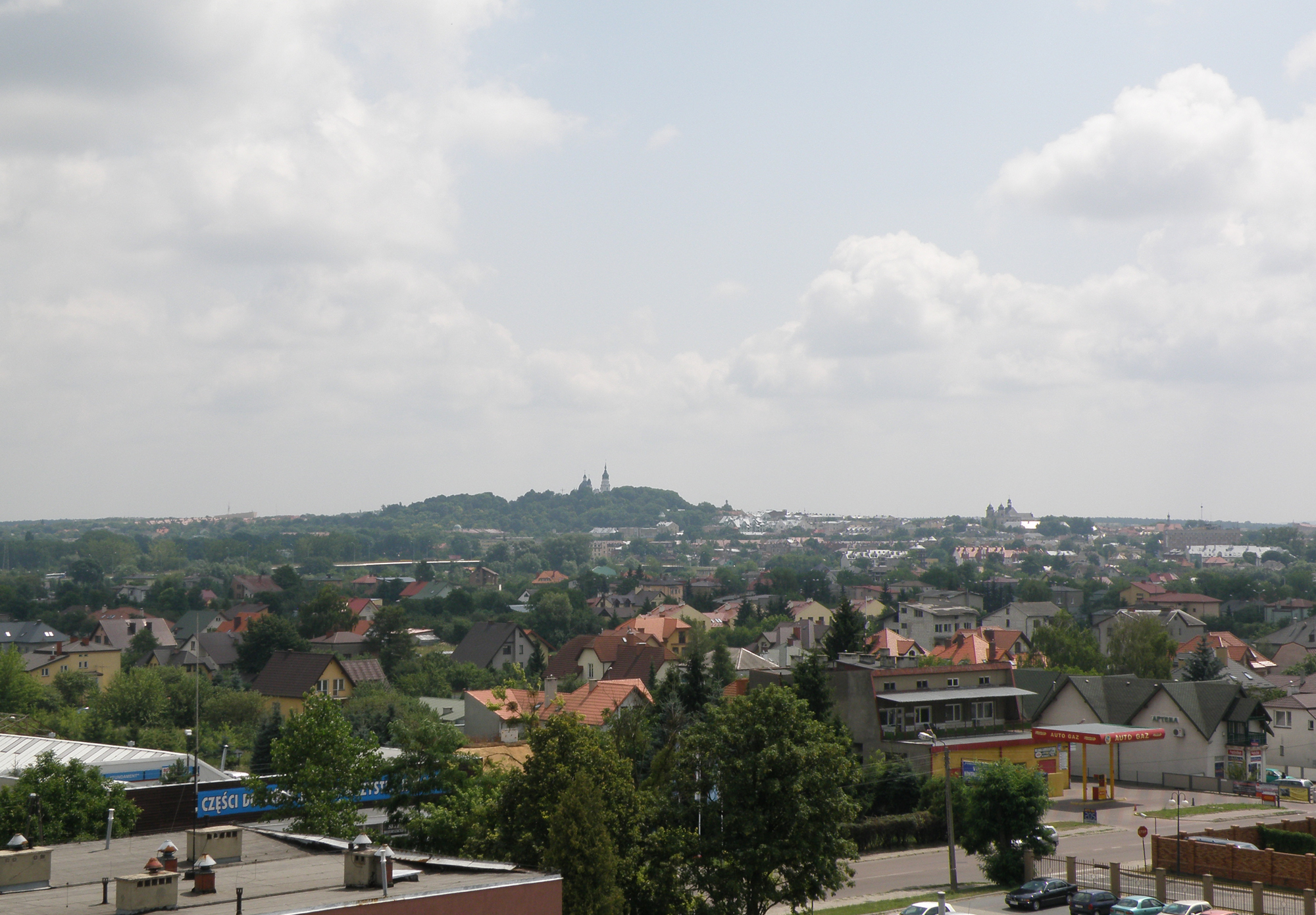
- View of Chełm
- Formation: 29 September 1995
- Type: Euroregion
- Headquarters: Chełm, Poland
- Region served: Upper Bug River
- Members: Poland; Ukraine; Belarus
- Website: http://euroregionbug.pl

Euroregion Bug is a Euroregion that encompasses cross-border areas of Belarus, Poland and Ukraine. The main aim of the agreement is to develop co-operation in the fields of: regional development, transport, communication, delivery of energy and water, nature protection, industry, trade, agriculture, education, science research, healthcare, culture, art, tourism, recreation and crime and public menace prevention.

== History ==
It was established on September 29, 1995 when the governors of the former Polish voivodeships (which were later rehashed by the administration reform of 1999) Lublin Voivodeship (Edward Hunek), Chełm Voivodeship (Marian Cichosz), Tarnobrzeg Voivodeship (Pawel Stawowy), Zamość Voivodeship (Stanislaw Rapa), and the Ukrainian Volyn Oblast (Borys Klymchuk) met in Lutsk to establish the association.

In May 1998 Belarus joined the Euroregion and, accordingly, among the new areas were added: the Polish Biała Podlaska Voivodeship and Belarusian Brest Oblast. Among the signatories were governors K.Michalski (Lublin Voivodeship), L.Burakowski (Chełm Voivodeship), M.Czarnecki (Biała Podlaska Voivodeship), M.Grzelaczyk (Zamość Voivodeship), W.Stasiak (Tarnobrzeg Voivodeship), V.A.Zalomai (Brest Oblast), B.Klymchuk (Volyn Oblast) and heads of local councils L.A.Lemyeshevski (Brest Voblast), V.Dmytruk (Volyn Oblast).

After the Polish reform of 1999, the Euroregion members representation has simplified including only three Brest Voblast, Volyn Oblast, and Lublin Voivodeship.

On May 12, 2000 two Ukrainian raions of Lviv Oblast Sokal and Zhovkva that are bordering Poland were admitted as new members of the region.

== Geography ==
Its area is about 80,000 km^{2}, population over 5,000,000. There are three administrative centers in the regions Lublin, Brest, and Lutsk that are also the biggest cities as well.
