= Euroregion =

Transnational-cooperation structure in the European Union

In European politics, the term Euroregion usually refers to a transnational co-operation structure between two (or more) contiguous territories located in different European countries. Euroregions represent a specific type of cross-border region.

== Scope ==
Euroregions usually do not correspond to any legislative or governmental institution and do not have direct political power. Their work is limited to the competencies of the local and regional authorities which constitute them. They are usually arranged to promote common interests across the border and to cooperate for the common good of the border populations.

== Criteria ==
The Association of European Border Regions sets the following criteria for the identification of Euroregions:

- an association of local and regional authorities on either side of the national border, sometimes with a parliamentary assembly
- a transfrontier association with a permanent secretariat and a technical and administrative team with its own resources
- of private law nature, based on non-profit-making associations or foundations on either side of the border in accordance with the respective national law in force
- of public law nature, based on inter-state agreements, dealing among other things, with the participation of territorial authorities

It is difficult to associate one legal framework with the term "Euroregion", as they operate across country borders and vary widely in their particular forms.

== Naming conventions ==
The naming convention for Euroregions is as varied as the forms of the regions themselves. The most common local names for a Euroregion include euregio, euregion, euroregion, eurorégion, euroregión, euroregione, euro-região, ευρωπεριοχή, europaregion, euroregiune, grande région, еврорегион (evroregion), regio, conseil, or council.

== List of Euroregions ==
The cooperating regions usually have different (local) names in each participating country. The regions are listed in alphabetical order of the corresponding English names. Listed are also the particular participating countries and the year the euroregion was founded.

English name of the euroregion Other local names of the euroregion	Participating countries	Founded
Adriatic Ionian Euroregion	Albania, Bosnia and Herzegovina, Croatia, Greece, Italy, Montenegro	2006
Alps–Mediterranean Euroregion; Euroregione Alpi Mediterraneo; Eurorégion Alpes-Méditerranée	France, Italy	2007
Archipelago (islands) committee Interreg Saaristo; Interreg Skärgården	Finland, Sweden	1978
ARKO (Arvika/Kongsvinger) euroregion	Norway, Sweden	1978
Nouvelle-Aquitaine–Basque Country–Navarre Euroregion	France, Spain	1982
Euroregion Baltic http://euroregionbaltic.eu Euroregion Baltija; Euroregion Bałtyk (Note: Significant territory held by a non-participating European nation.)	Denmark, Lithuania, Poland, Sweden	1998
Euroregion Euromed	Croatia, Cyprus, France, Greece, Italy, Malta, Portugal, Slovenia, Spain	2004
Barents Euro-Arctic Council; Barentsrådet	Finland, Norway, Sweden	1993
Bavarian forest - Bohemian Forest / Šumava euroregion Euroregio Bayerischer Wald-Böhmerwald/Sumava; Euroregion Šumava-Bavorský les	Austria, Czech Republic, Germany	1994
Belasica euroregion	Bulgaria, Greece, Republic of North Macedonia	2003
"BENEGO" (Belgisch-Nederlands Grensoverleg = Belgian-Dutch border consultation)	Belgium, Netherlands	1980
Benelux-Middengebied Euroregion	Belgium, Luxembourg, Netherlands	1984
Beskydy Mountains euroregion Euroregion Beskidy; Euroregión Beskidy	Czech Republic, Poland, Slovakia	2000
Black Sea Euroregion; Euroregiunea Mării Negre; Черноморски еврорегион	Bulgaria, Romania	2008
Białowieża Forest Euroregion; Euroregion Puszcza Białowieska	Belarus, Poland	2002
Biharia Euroregion; Euroregiunea Biharia; Biharia Eurorégió	Romania, Hungary	2007?
Euroregion Bug; Єврорегіон «Буг» Еўрарэгіён «Буг»	Poland, Ukraine	1995
Carpathian Euroregion; Euroregiunea Carpatică; Euroregion Karpacki; Karpatský euroregión Kárpátok eurorégió Карпатський єврорегіон	Hungary, Poland, Romania, Slovakia, Ukraine	1993
Central North committee Mittnordenkommittén	Finland, Norway, Sweden	1977
Cieszyn Silesia euroregion Euroregion Tešínské Slezsko; Euroregion Śląsk Cieszyński	Czech Republic, Poland	1998
Cross-channel euroregion (part of the Arc Manche regional network and assembly); Kent & Nord Pas-de-Calais/Belgium; Region Transmanche	Belgium, France, United Kingdom	1991
Danube 21 euroregion	Bulgaria, Romania, Serbia	1992
Danube–Drava–Sava Euroregion	Bosnia and Herzegovina, Croatia, Hungary	1998
Danube–Criș–Mureș–Tisa Euroregion; Euroregiunea Dunăre-Criş-Mureş-Tisa; Duna-Körös-Maros-Tisza Eurorégió; Evroregija Dunav-Kriš-Moriš-Tisa	Romania, Hungary, Serbia	1997
Dnepr euroregion	Ukraine	2003
Euroregion Dniester	Ukraine, Moldova	2012
Dobrava euroregion	Czech Republic, Poland	2001
Donbas Euroregion	Ukraine	2010
Drina-Sava-Majevica euroregion	Bosnia and Herzegovina, Croatia, Serbia	2003
East Sussex/Seine-Maritime/Somme Euroregion (part of the Arc Manche regional network and assembly); Rives-Manche Region	France, United Kingdom	1993
Egrensis Euroregion; EuroRegio Egrensis	Czech Republic, Germany	1993
Elbe/Labe Euroregion; Euroregion Elbe/Labe	Czech Republic, Germany	1992
Ems Dollart Region; Eems-Dollard Regio	Germany, Netherlands	1977
"EUREGIO"; Euregion Enschede-Gronau	Germany, Netherlands	1958
Eurobalkans	Bulgaria, Republic of North Macedonia, Serbia	2002
EUROACE Euroregion; Euroregião Alentejo-Região Centro-Extremadura; Eurorregión Alentejo-Región Centro de Portugal-Extremadura	Spain, Portugal	2009
Glacensis Euroregion; Euroregion Pomezí Čech, Moravy a Kladska	Czech Republic, Poland	1996
Galicia–North Portugal Euroregion; Eurorregião Galiza-Norte de Portugal; Eurorrexión Galicia-Norte de Portugal	Spain, Portugal	2008
Helsinki-Tallinn Euroregion (Talsinki)	Estonia, Finland	1999
Inn-Salzach Euroregion; Inn-Salzach EuRegio	Austria, Germany	1994
Inntal Euroregion	Austria, Germany	1998
Insubria euroregion Regio Insubria	Italy, Switzerland	1995
International Lake Constance conference Internationale Bodenseekonferenz	Austria, Germany, Switzerland	1972
Ister-Granum Euroregion; Ister-Granum Eurorégió	Hungary, Slovakia	2003
Euregio Karelia	Finland	2000
Kvarken council Interreg Kvarken-MittSkandia; Interreg Kvarken –MidtSkandia; Interreg Merenkurkku-MittSkandia	Finland, Norway, Sweden	1972
Mesta–Nestos euroregion	Bulgaria, Greece	1997
Meuse–Rhine Euroregion; Euregio Maas-Rhein; Euregio Maas-Rijn; Eurégion Meuse-Rhin	Belgium, Germany, Netherlands	1976
Neisse-Nisa-Nysa euroregion Euroregion Neisse-Nisa-Nysa; Euroregion Neisse, Nisa, Nysa	Czech Republic, Germany, Poland	1991
Neman euroregion Niemen (Nieman) Euroregion; Euroregion Nemunas	Lithuania, Poland	1997
North Calotte Council; Nordkalottrådet; Pohjoiskalotin neuvosto	Finland, Norway, Sweden	1971
Ore Mountains euroregion Euroregion Krušnohoří; Euroregion Erzgebirge	Czech Republic, Germany	1992
Øresund Region	Denmark, Sweden	2000
Østfold-Bohuslän/Dalsland euroregion Grensekomiteen Østfold Bohuslän/Dalsland; Gränskommittén Østfold - Bohuslän/Dalsland	Norway, Sweden	1980
Pomerania euroregion Euroregion Pomerania	Denmark (suggested), Germany, Poland, Sweden	1995
Pomoraví - Záhorie - Weinviertel euroregion	Austria, Czech Republic, Slovakia	1999
Praděd euroregion Euroregion Praděd; Euroregion Pradziad	Czech Republic, Poland	1997
Pro Europa Viadrina euroregion	Germany, Poland	1993
Pyrenees–Mediterranean Euroregion; Euroregió Pirineus Mediterrània; Eurorregión Pirineos Mediterráneo; Eurorégion Pyrénées-Méditerranée	France, Spain	2004
Raetia Nova euroregion Nova Raetia	Austria, Switzerland	1990s?
Region Southern Jutland-Schleswig; Region Sønderjylland-Schleswig	Denmark, Germany	1997
Rhine-Waal euroregion Euregio Rhein-Waal; Euregio Rijn-Waal	Germany, Netherlands	1973
Rhine-Meuse-North euroregion Euregio Rhein-Maas-Nord; Euregio Rijn-Maas-Noord	Germany, Netherlands	1978
Saar-Lorraine-Luxembourg-Rhin euroregion	Germany, France, Luxembourg	1995
Salzburg-Berchtesgadener Land-Traunstein euroregion	Austria, Germany	1993
Scheldemond euroregion Conseil de l'Estuaire de l'Escaut	Belgium, Netherlands	1989
Sea Alps euroregion Euroregione “Alpi del Mare” Eurorégion des “Alpes de la Mer”	France, Italy	1990
Silesia euroregion	Czech Republic, Poland	1998
Silva Nortica euroregion Euroregion Silva Nortica / Jihočeská Silva Nortica	Austria, Czech Republic	2002
Spree-Neisse-Bober euroregion Sprewa-Nysa-Bóbr Euroregion	Germany, Poland	1992
Tatra Euroregion; Euroregion Tatry; Euroregión Tatry	Poland, Slovakia	1994
Tornio River Valley Council; The Tornedalen Council; Tornedalsrådet; Tornionlaakson Neuvosto	Finland, Sweden	1987
Tyrol–South Tyrol–Trentino Euroregion; Europaregion Tirol-Südtirol-Trentino; Euregione Tirolo-Alto Adige-Trentino	Austria, Italy	1998
TriRhena euroregion Regio TriRhena	Germany, France, Switzerland	1995
Siret – Prut – Nistru euroregion Regiunea Siret - Prut - Nistru	Romania, Republic of Moldova	2000
Stara Planina euroregion	Serbia, Bulgaria	2006
Superior Prut and Lower Danube euroregion Euroregiunea Dunărea de Jos	Romania, Republic of Moldova and Ukraine	1998
Via Salina euroregion Ausserfern and Kleinwalsertal/Bregenzerwald Euregio	Austria, Germany	1997
West/West Pannonia euroregion	Austria, Hungary	1998
White Carpathians euroregion Euroregion Bílé Karpaty; Euroregión Biele Karpaty	Czech Republic, Slovakia	2000
Zugspitze-Wetterstein-Karwendel euroregion	Austria, Germany	1998

== See also ==
- Eurodistrict
- European Grouping for Territorial Cooperation
- British–Irish Council
- North/South Ministerial Council
