= Silesia Euroregion =

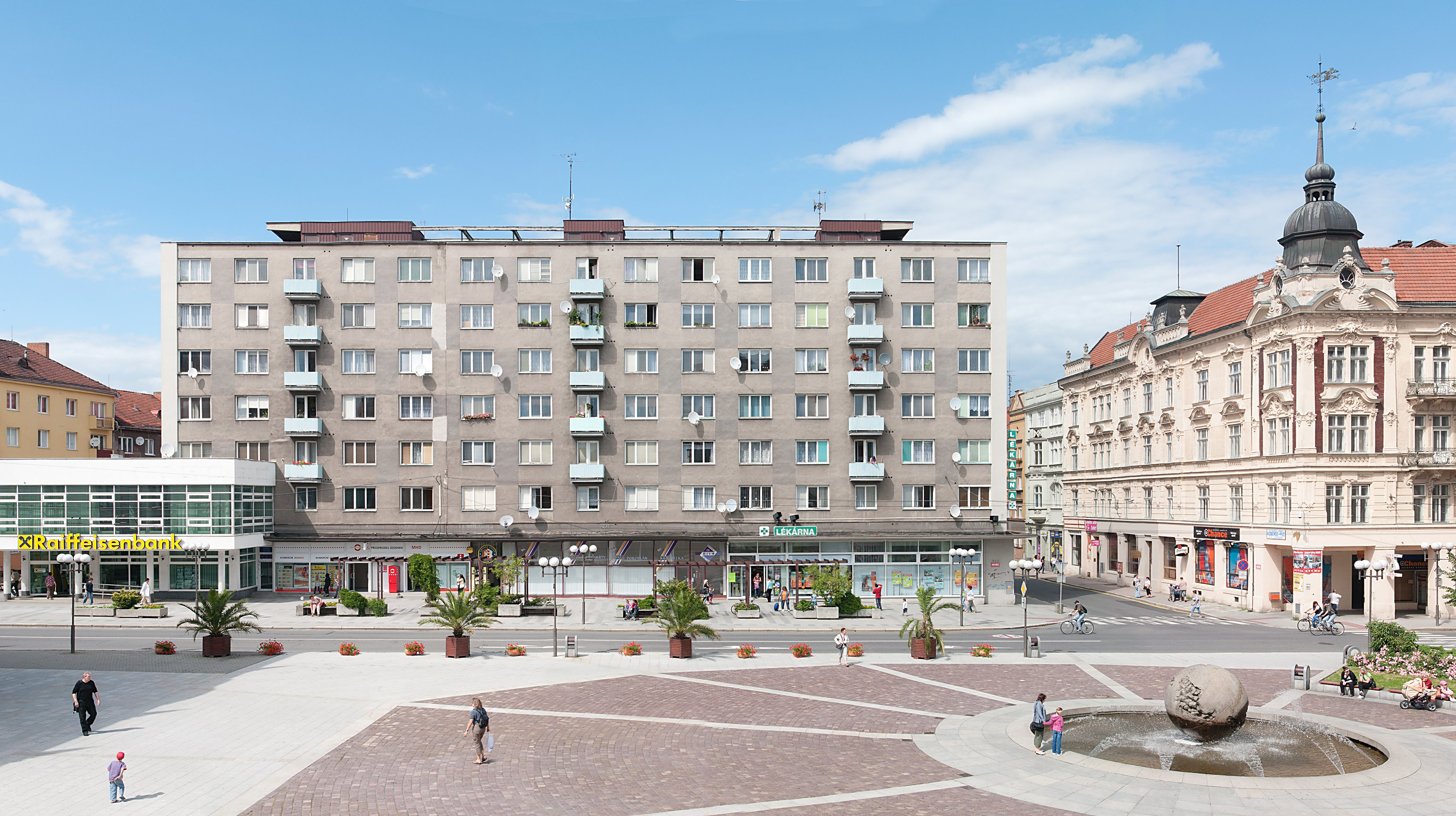
Opava, where the seat is located

Euroregion Silesia is a Euroregion in Poland and the Czech Republic.

== Description and purpose ==
The Euroregion comprises 22 gminas on the Polish side (in the counties of Racibórz, Rybnik, Wodzisław in the Silesian Voivodeship and the Glubczyce County in the Opole Voivodeship) and 52 municipalities on the Czech side (in the districts of Opava, Bruntál and Nový Jičín, plus the city of Ostrava). The seat of the Euroregion is located in Opava.

The aim of the Euroregion is to undertake joint activities for the economic and social development of the region and to bring its inhabitants and institutions closer together.

== History ==
The Euroregion was established in September 1998 under the agreement of the Association of Municipalities of the Upper Oder River on the Polish side and the Regional Association for the Czech-Polish Cooperation Opavian Silesia on the Czech side.

== See also ==
- Silesia
- List of euroregions
