= Tatra Euroregion =

- Administrative seat: Nowy Targ, Poland
- Type: Euroregion
- Membership: Orava; Spiš; Liptov; Podhale
- Establishment: 1994

The Tatra Euroregion (Polish: Euroregion Tatry, Slovak: Euroregión Tatry) is a Polish-Slovak Euroregion established on August 26, 1994, pursuant to a declaration signed in Nowy Targ. The members are Polish towns of Nowy Targ, Rabka-Zdrój, Szczawnica, Limanowa and thirteen Polish border communes, as well as Slovak towns and villages of the districts of Liptovský Mikuláš, Poprad and Stará Ľubovňa.

The seat of the Euroregion is located in Nowy Targ.

Days of Polish and Slovak culture are held under the auspices of the Euroregion. The main goals are environmental protection and economic development.
