= Black Sea Euroregion =

Seaside Euroregion in Bulgaria and Romania

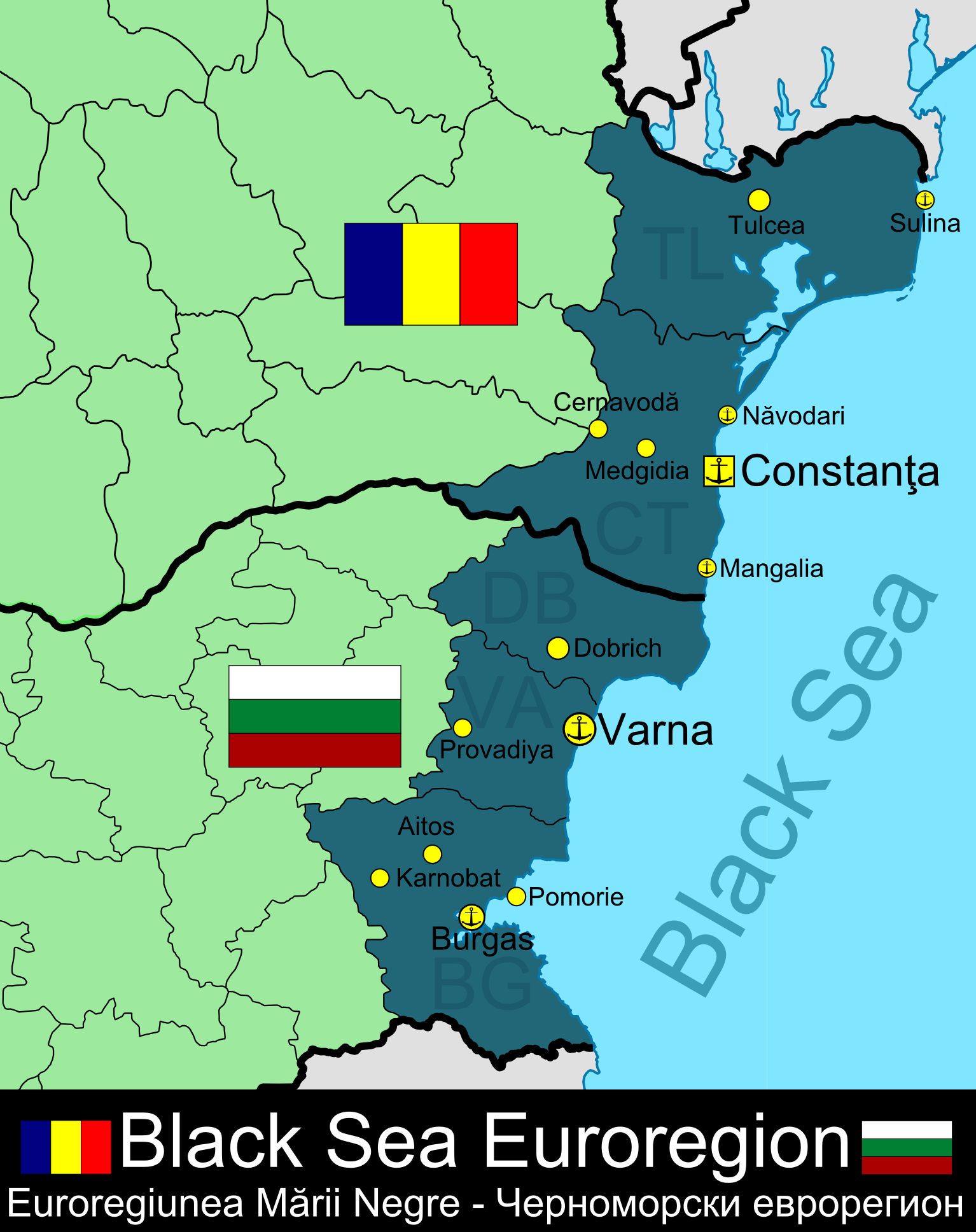
Map of Black Sea Euroregion

Black Sea Euroregion (Bulgarian: Черноморски еврорегион, transcript. Chernomorski evroregion, Romanian: Euroregiunea Mării Negre) is a seaside Euroregion, located in Bulgaria and Romania.

== Creation ==
The Congress of the Council of Europe launched a Black Sea Euroregion on 26 September 2008, when the constituent act was signed by 14 authorities in four countries.

== Composition ==
The region is composed of:

- Burgas Province, Dobrich Province and Varna Province in Bulgaria (16,300 km^{2}, 1,060,000 inhabitants)
- Constanța County and Tulcea County in Romania (15,600 km^{2}, 980,000 inhabitants)

The largest city is Varna, The administrative center of the euroregion is Varna. The port of Constanța is marginally the largest port on the Black Sea.

== Largest cities ==
This is a list of cities over 10.000 inhabitants in the region:

City	Population	Metro	Country
Varna	332,686	523,737	Bulgaria
Constanța	310,471	446,595	Romania
Burgas	200.264	410,000	Bulgaria
Tulcea	92,379		Romania
Dobrich	89,472		Bulgaria
Medgidia	44,850		Romania
Mangalia	41,153		Romania
Năvodari	34,669		Romania
Cernavodă	19,890		Romania
Aitos	19,537		Bulgaria
Karnobat	18,394		Bulgaria
Pomorie	14,170		Bulgaria
Ovidiu	13,458		Romania
Nesebar	13,347		Bulgaria
Provadiya	13,090		Bulgaria
Kavarna	11,368		Bulgaria
Balchik	11,321		Bulgaria
Hârşova	11,198		Romania
Murfatlar	10,857		Romania
Măcin	10,625		Romania
Babadag	10,037		Romania

== Objectives ==
The "Black Sea Euro-region" initiative seeks to encourage greater awareness and careful use of the Black Sea resources and their sustainable management, as well as regionalisation processes in the area.
