= Carpathian Euroregion =

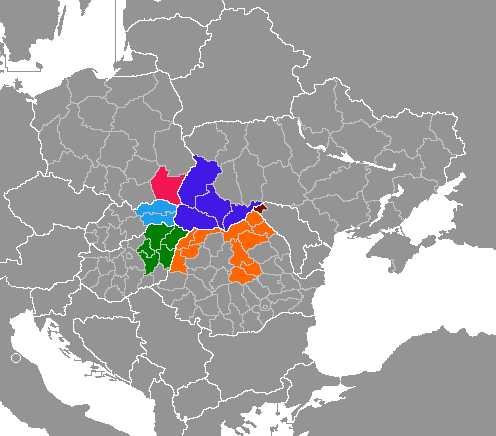
Location of Carpathian Euroregion on the map of Europe

Geographical map of the Carpathian Mountains

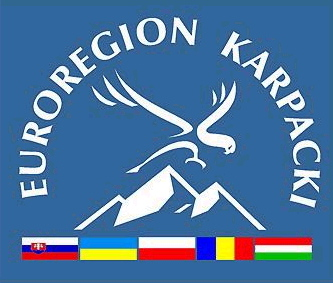
Logo (text in Polish)

The Carpathian Euroregion is an international association formed on February 14, 1993, by the representatives of the regional administrations of Poland, Ukraine, Slovakia and Hungary in the city of Debrecen. In 2000, the request from several regional administrations of Romania to join the Euroregion was accepted.

== The region ==
The Carpathian Euroregion comprises 19 administrative units of five countries from Central and East Europe, which are Poland, Slovakia, Hungary, Ukraine and Romania. Its total area is about 160 000 km^{2} or over 60 thousands square miles. It is inhabited by over 15 million people.

The Carpathian Euroregion is designed to bring together the people who inhabit the region of the Carpathian Mountains and to facilitate their cooperation in the fields of science, culture, education, trade, tourism and economy.

Due to its size, another Euroregion was created within it: the Biharia Euroregion, centered in Oradea. It covers two neighboring counties of Bihor in Romania and Hajdu-Bihar in Hungary.

=== Constituent regions ===
- (Romania) (7): Bihor County, Botoșani County, Harghita County, Maramureș County, Sălaj County, Satu Mare County, Suceava County
- (Hungary) (5): Borsod-Abaúj-Zemplén County, Hajdú-Bihar County, Heves County, Jász-Nagykun-Szolnok County, Szabolcs-Szatmár-Bereg County
- (Ukraine) (4): Chernivtsi Oblast, Ivano-Frankivsk Oblast, Lviv Oblast, Zakarpattya Oblast
- (Slovakia) (2): Košice Region, Prešov Region
- (Poland) (1): Subcarpathian Voivodeship

=== Largest cities ===
1. Lviv (Ukraine) - 729,000
2. Chernivtsi (Ukraine) - 259,000
3. Košice (Slovakia) - 235,000
4. Ivano-Frankivsk (Ukraine) - 225,500
5. Oradea (Romania) - 206,600
6. Debrecen (Hungary) - 206,200
7. Rzeszów (Poland) - 179,500
8. Miskolc (Hungary) - 169,200

== Gallery ==
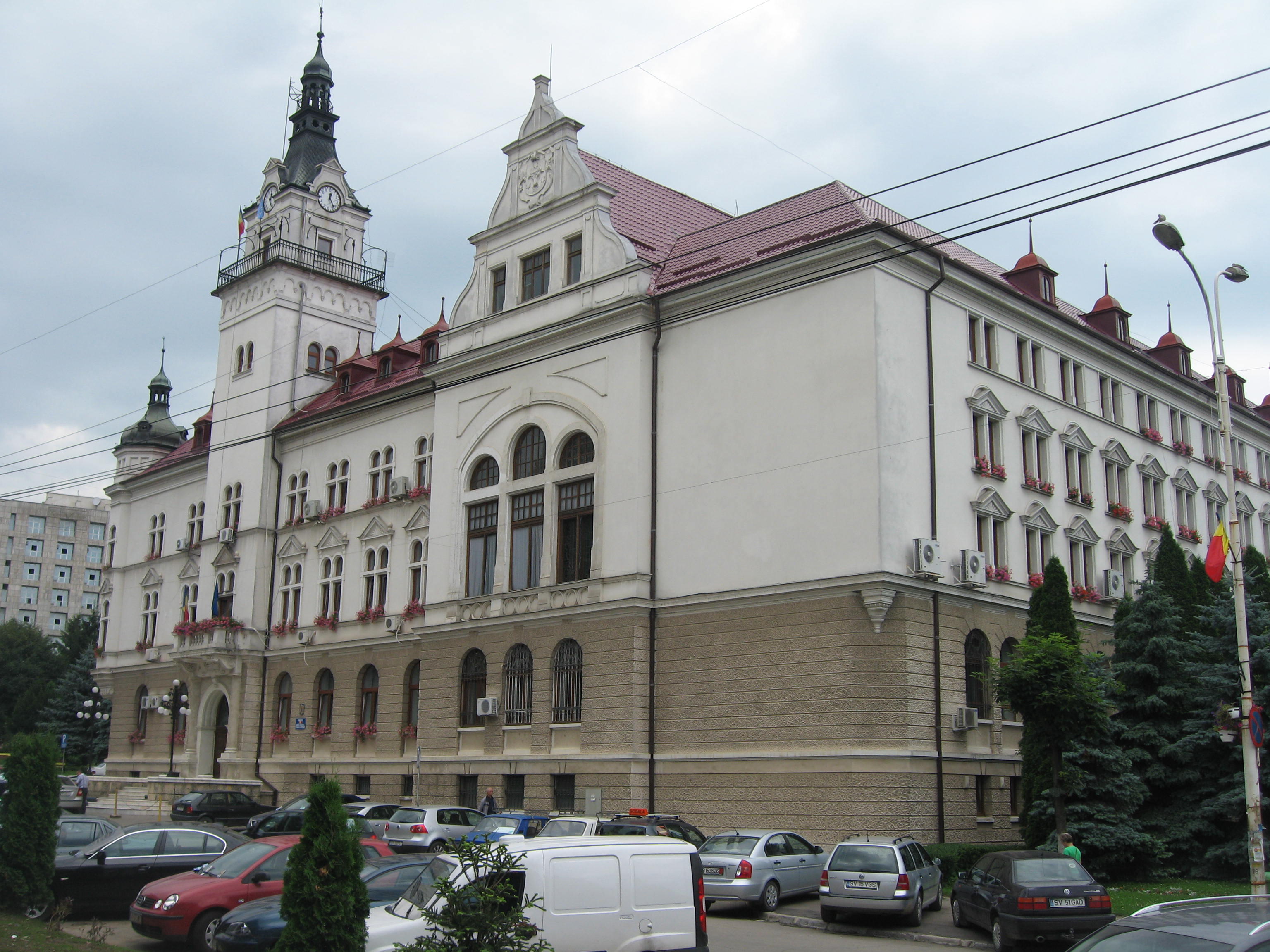
Suceava

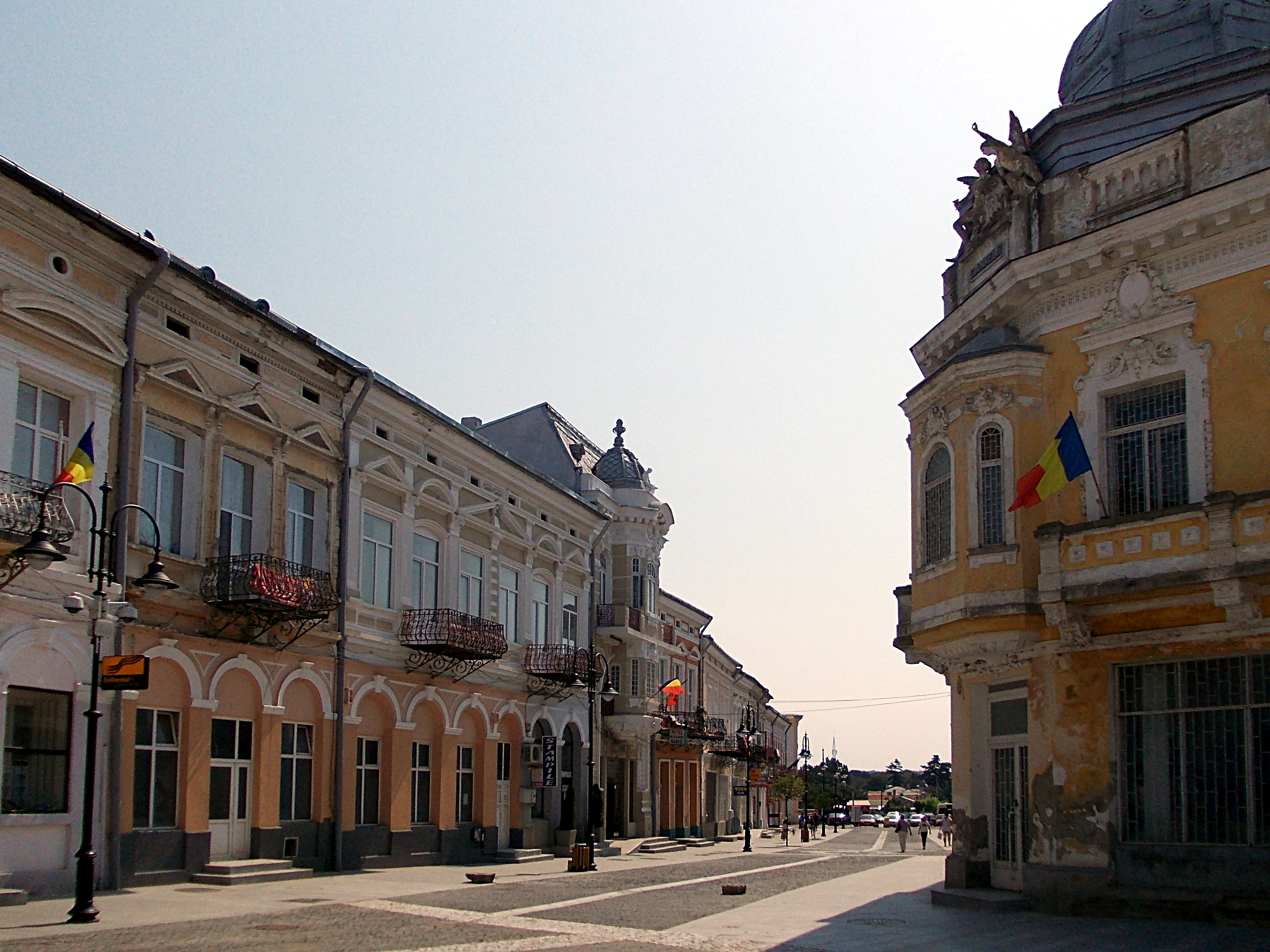
Botoşani

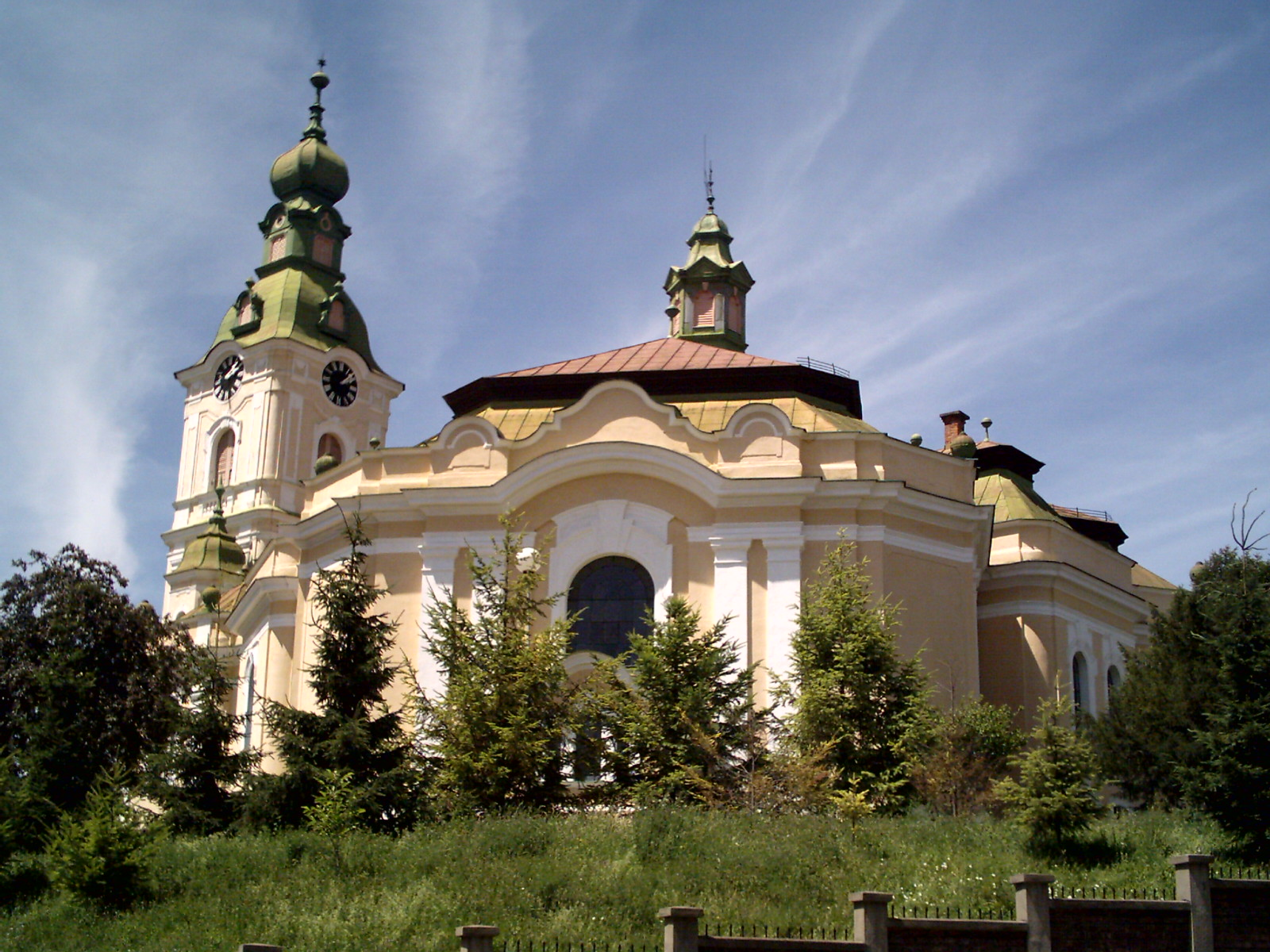
Zalău

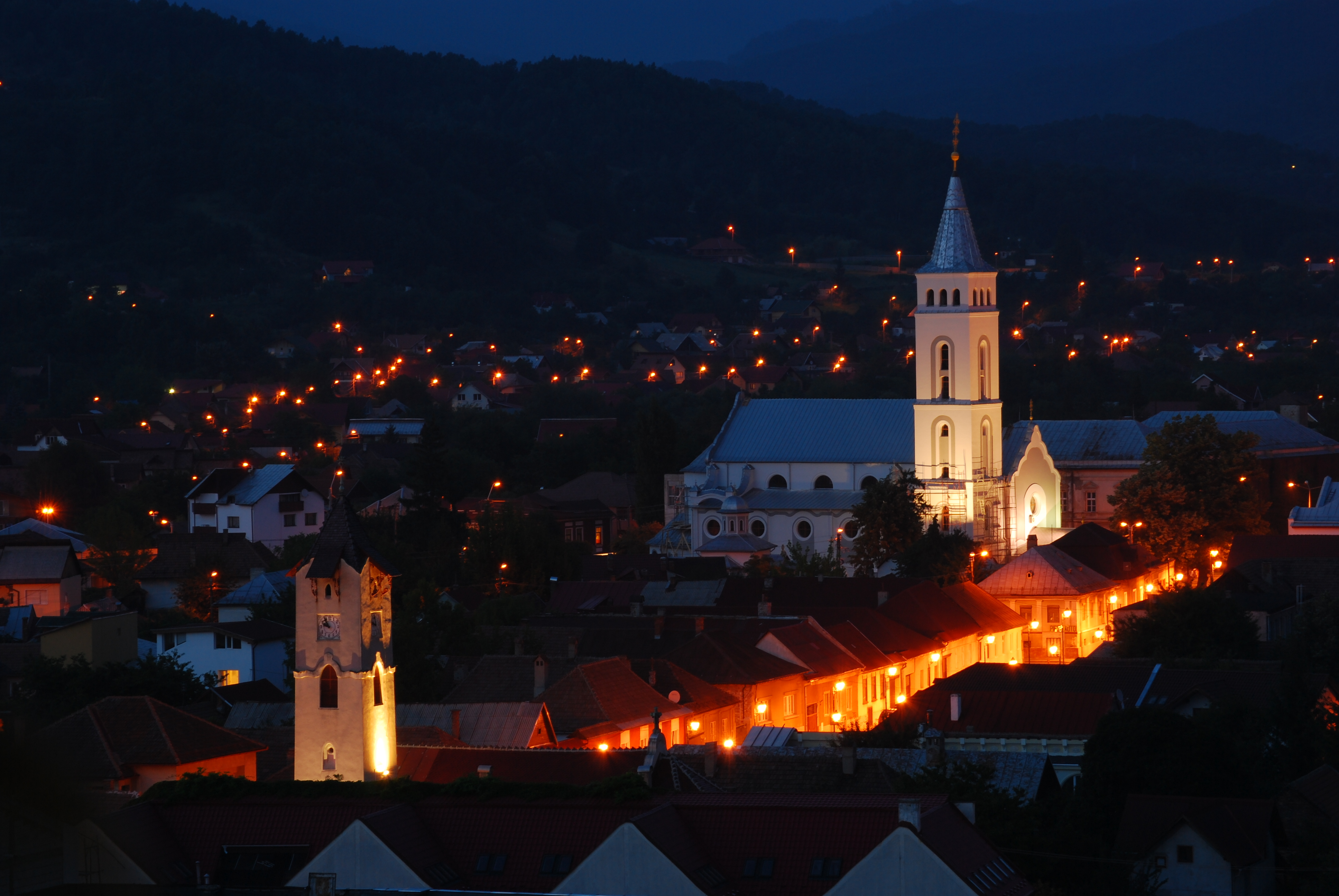
Baia Mare

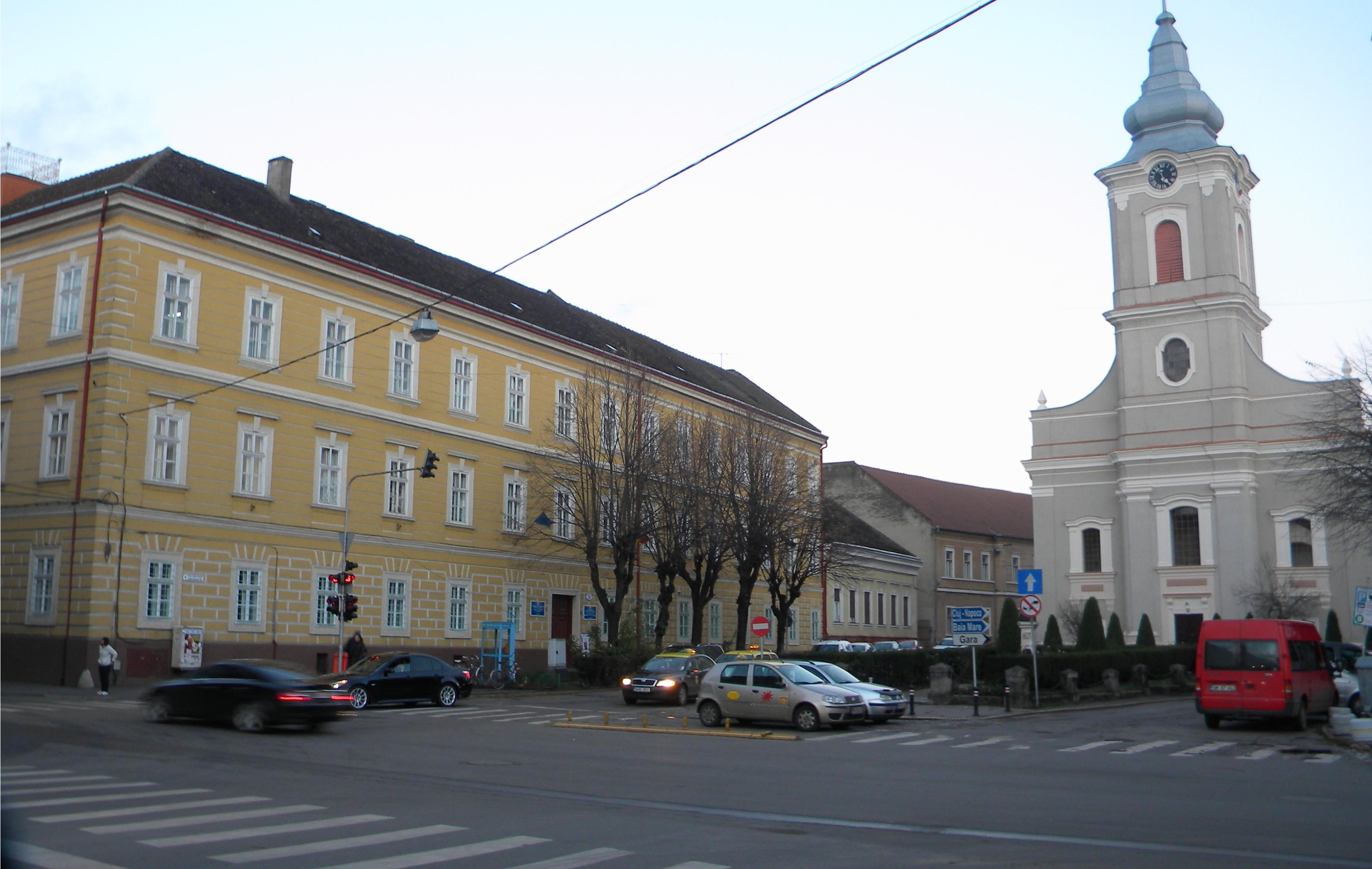
Satu Mare

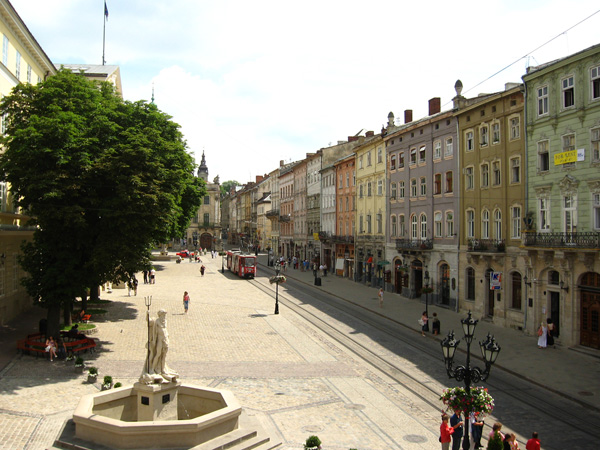
Lviv

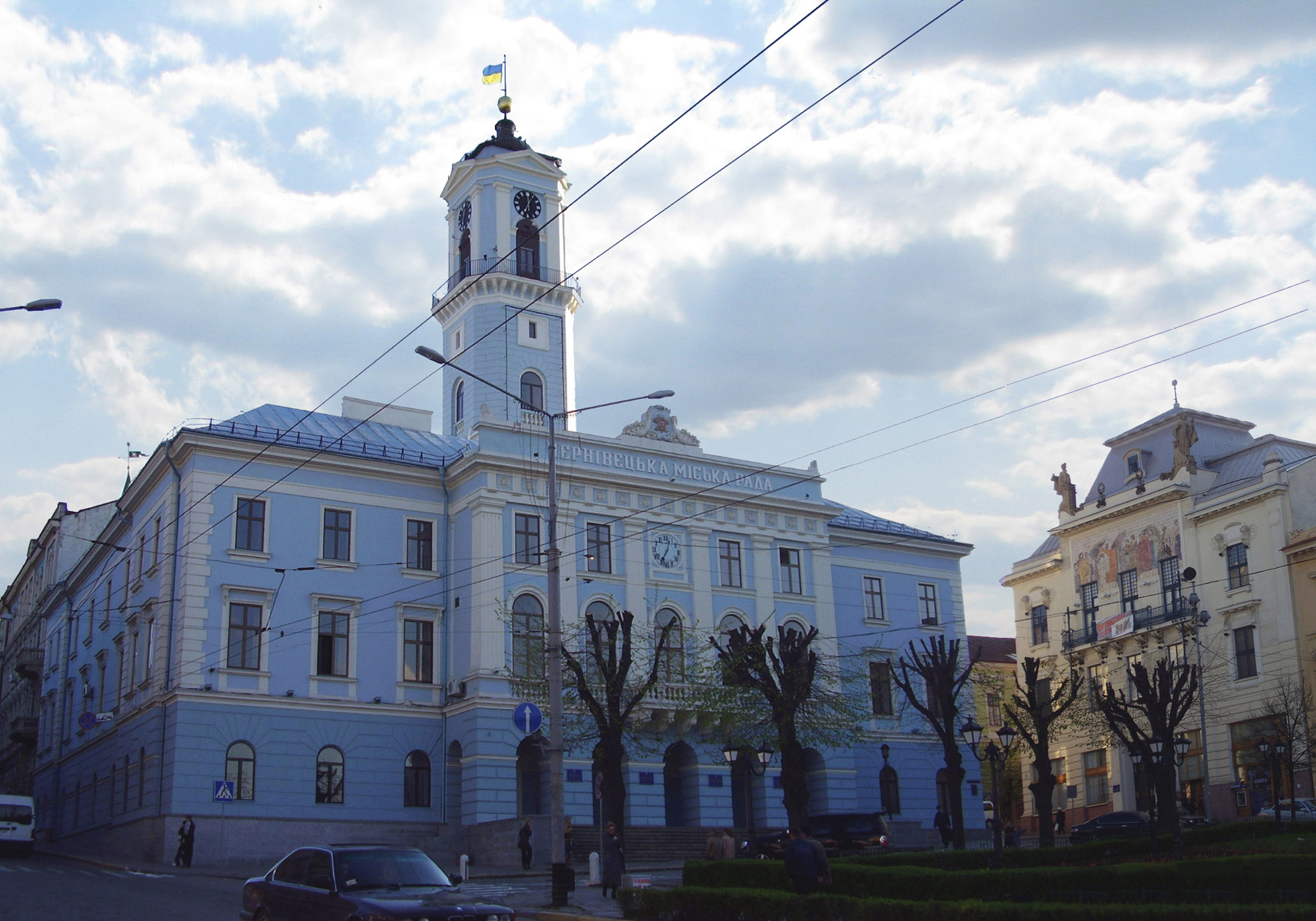
Chernivtsi

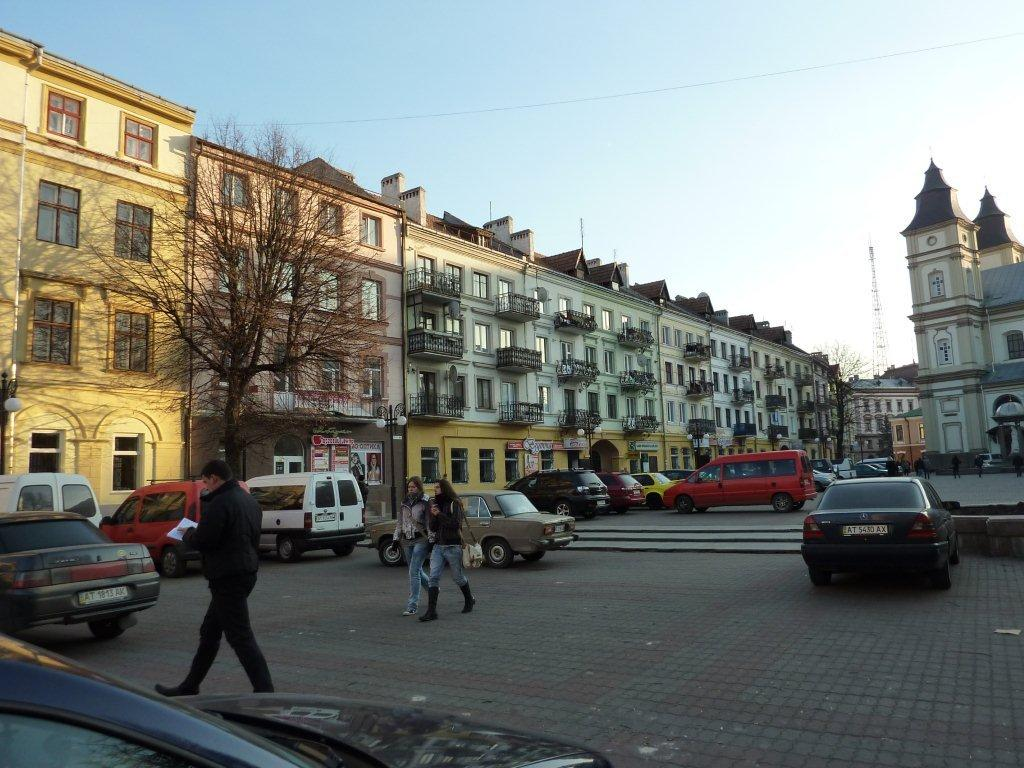
Ivano-Frankivsk

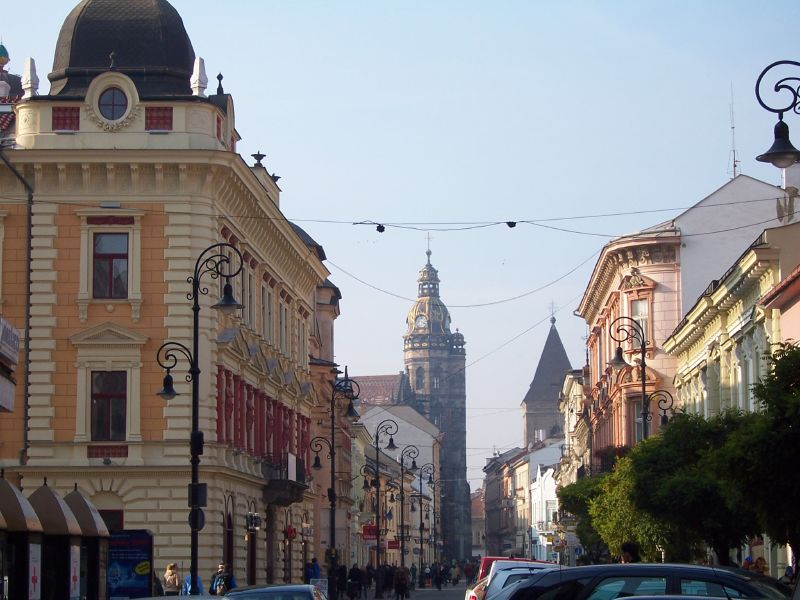
Košice

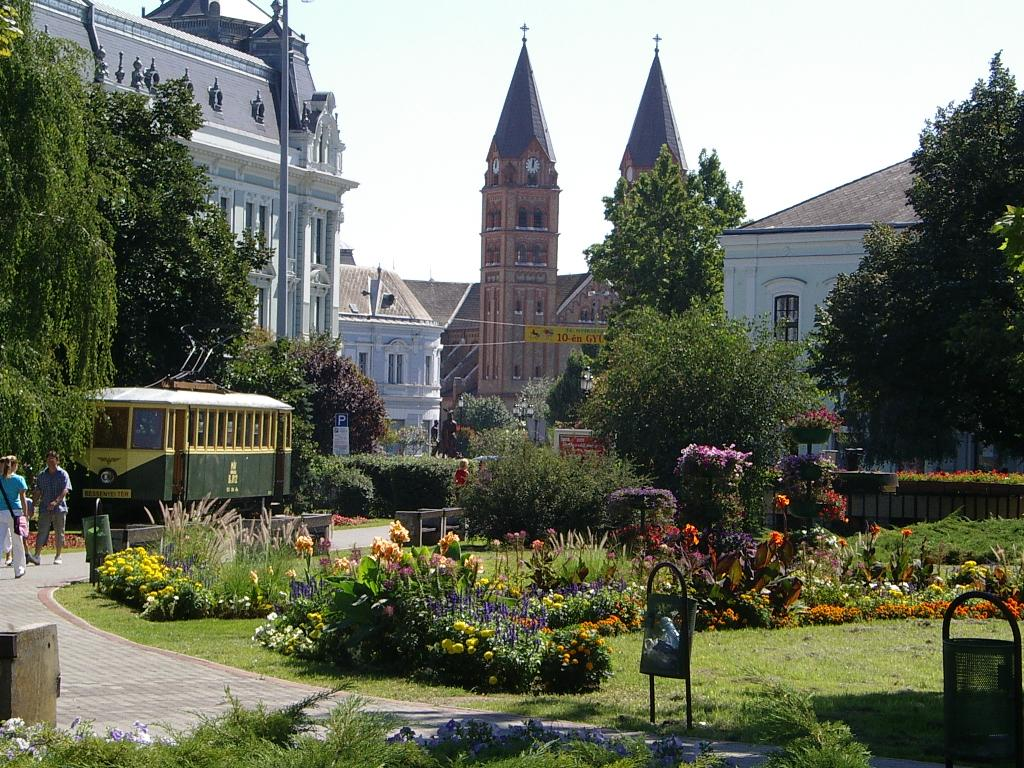
Nyíregyháza

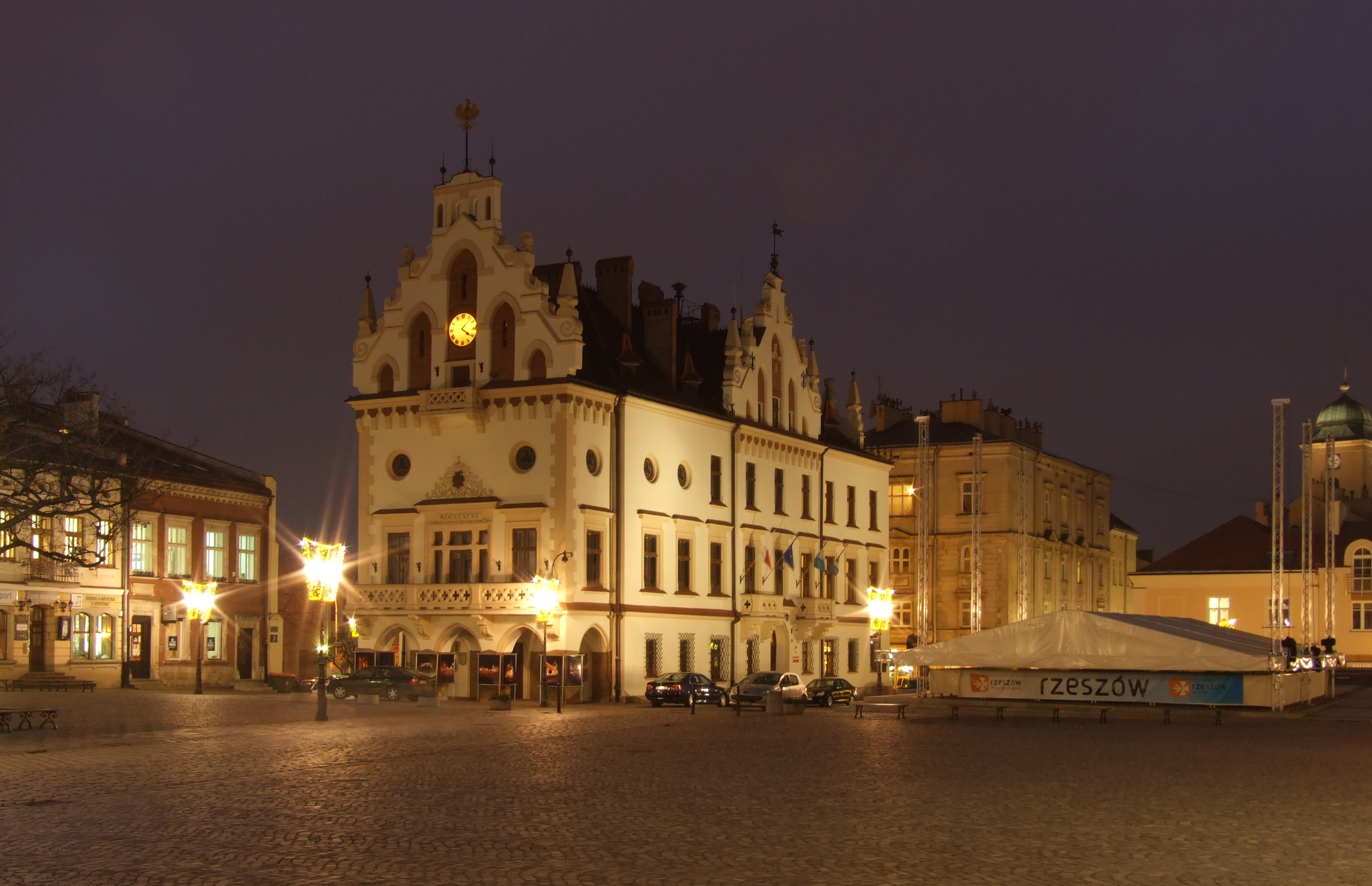
Rzeszów
