= Danube 21 Euroregion =

Euroregion in eastern Europe

Coordinates: 44°18′57″N 23°48′1″E

Danube 21 Euroregion is a Euroregion located in Romania, Bulgaria and Serbia. The administrative center is Craiova.

== Gallery ==
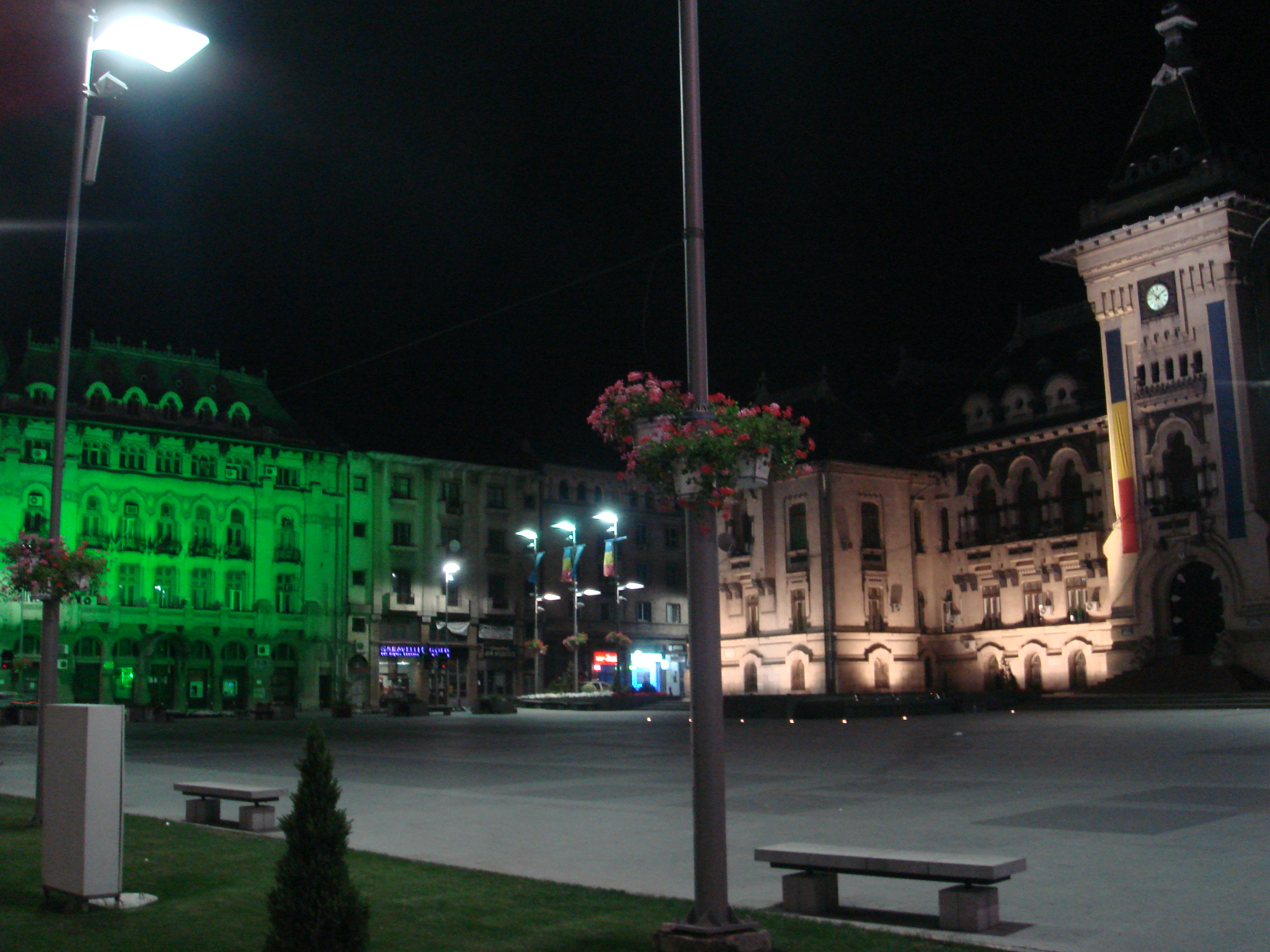
Craiova

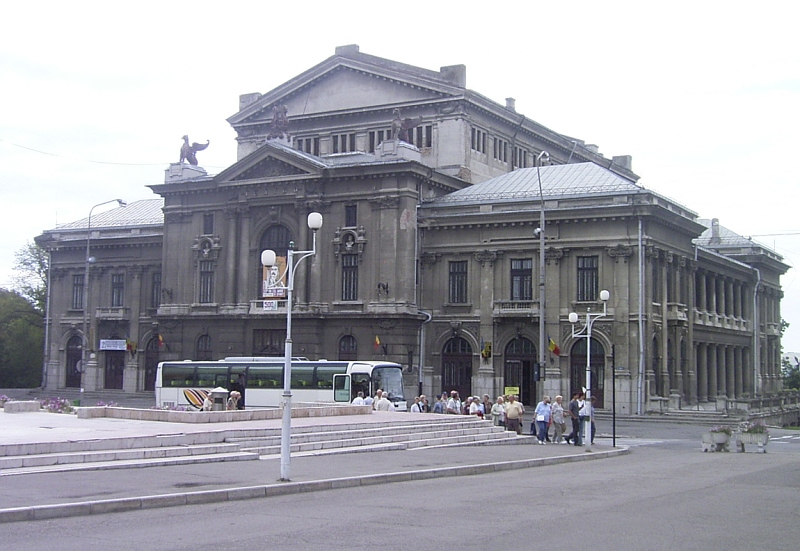
Drobeta-Turnu Severin

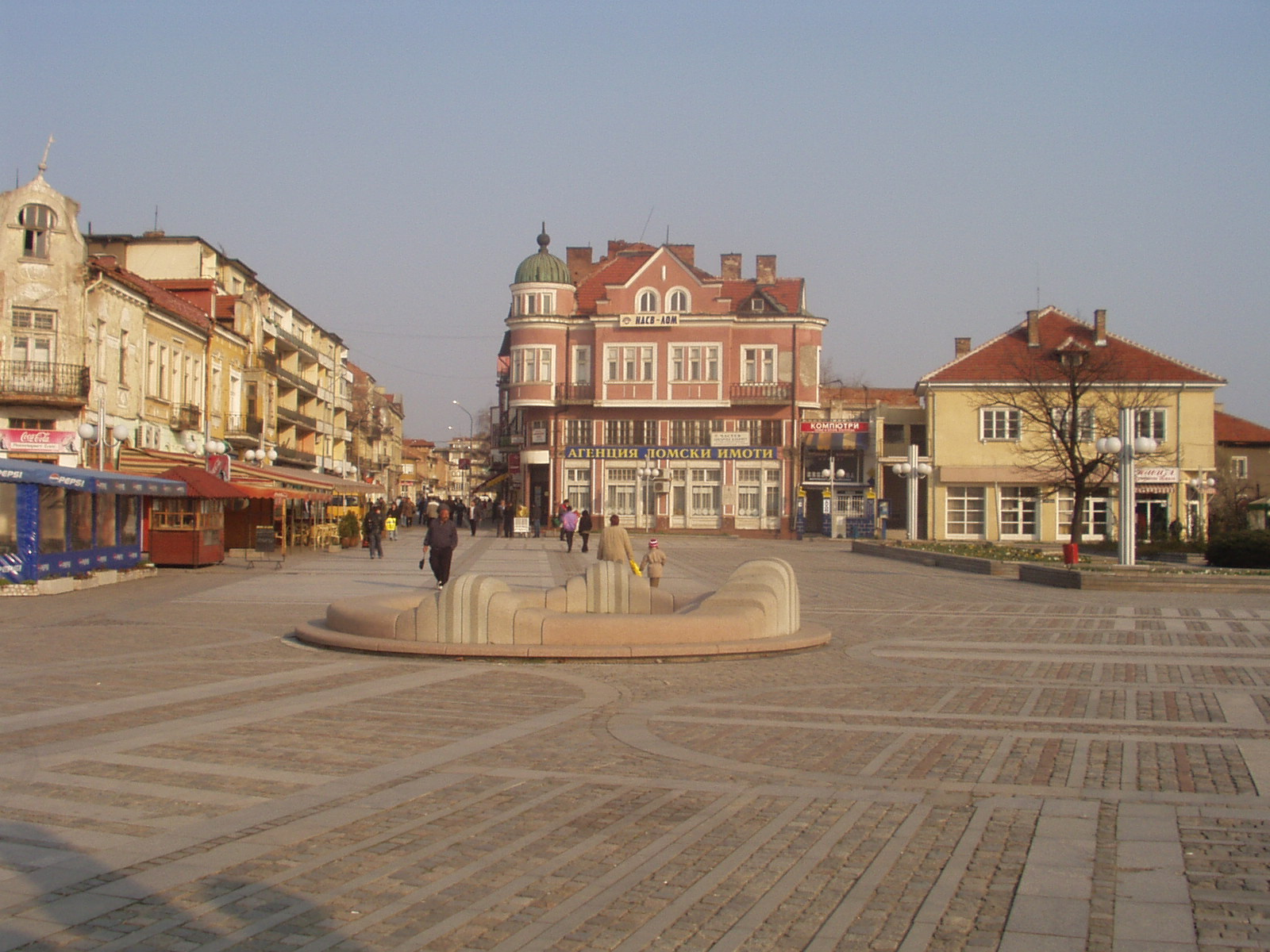
Lom

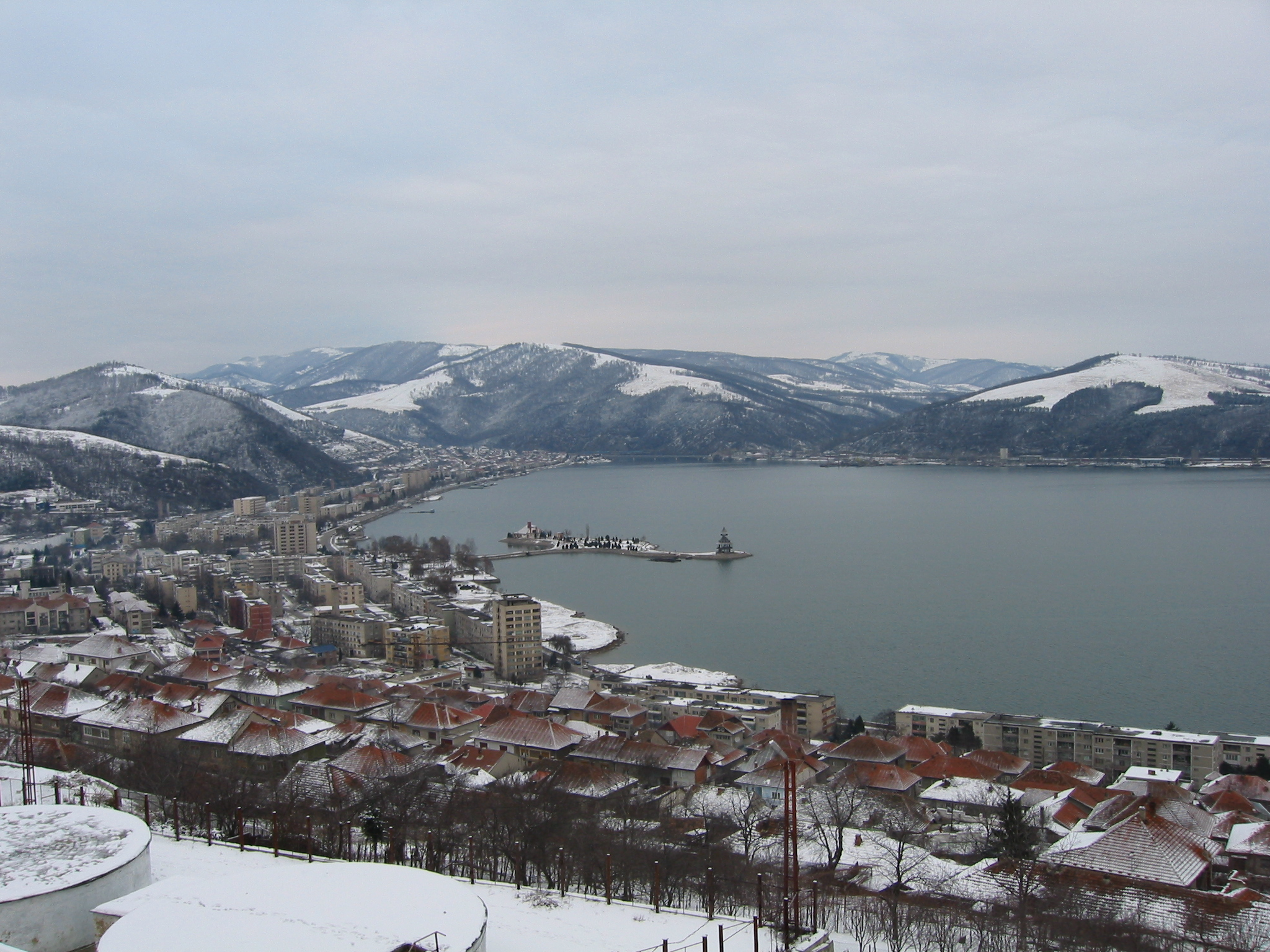
Orşova

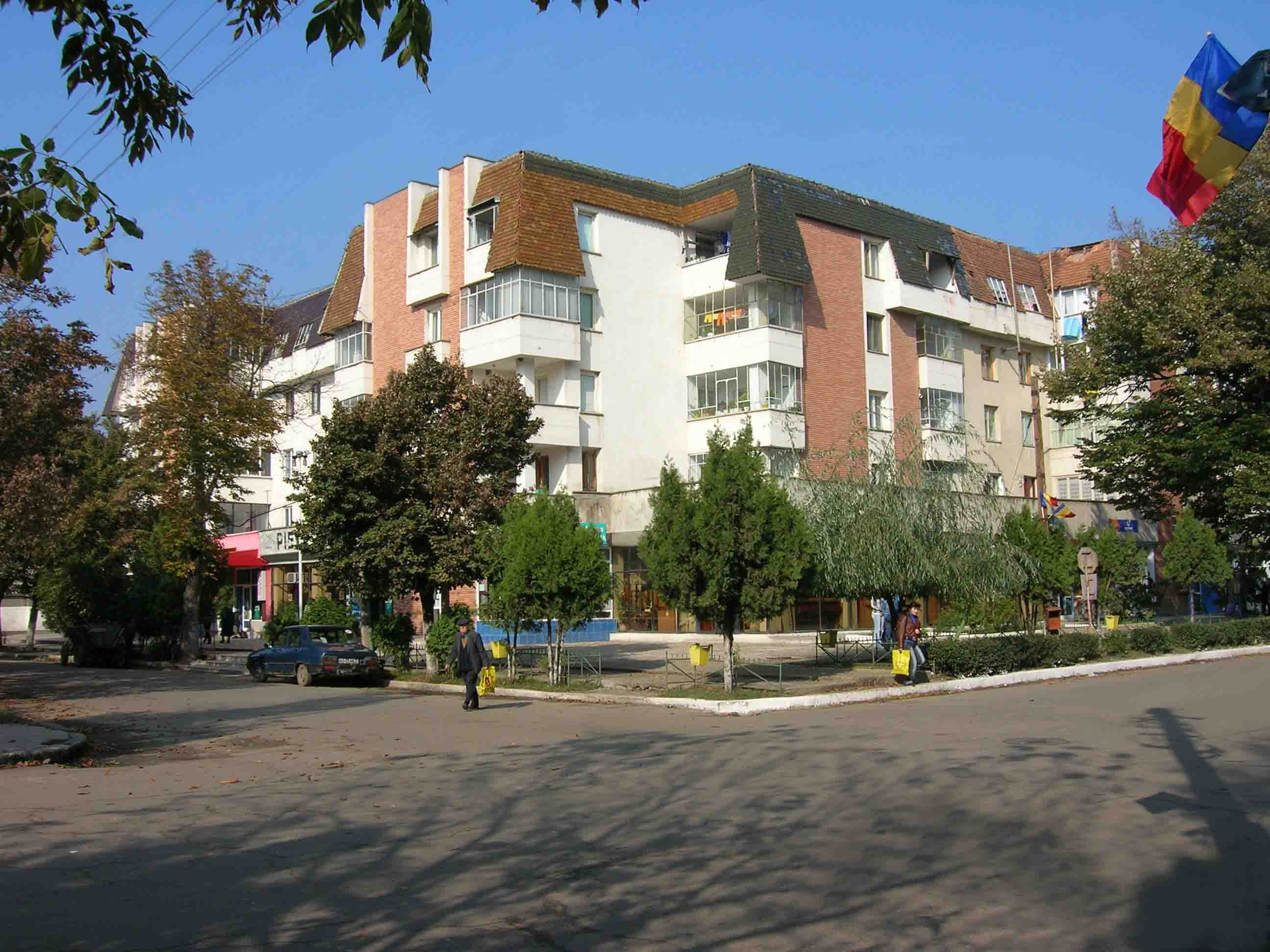
Corabia

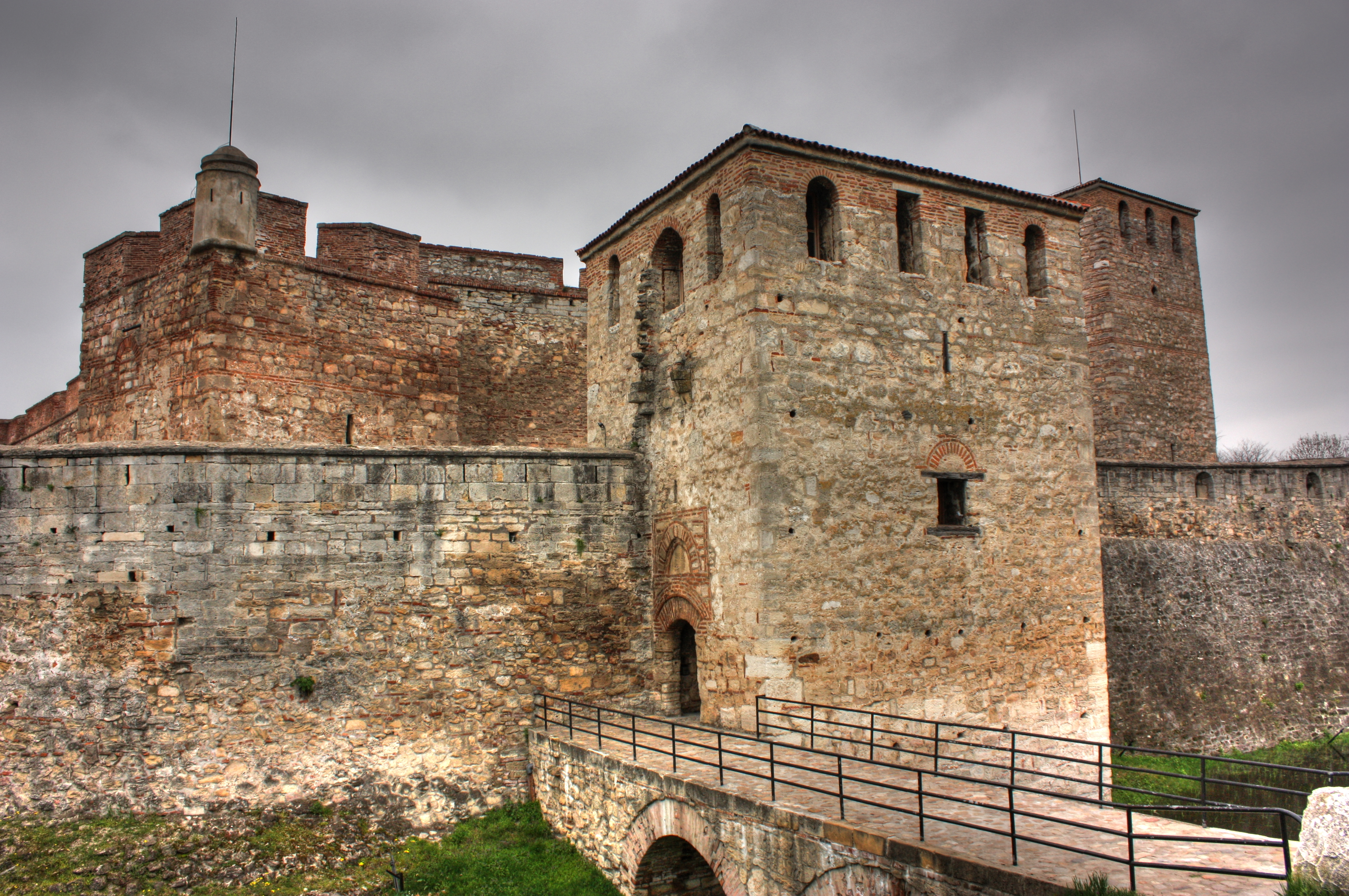
Vidin
