= Siret–Prut–Nistru =

Euroregion in Romania and Moldova

Logo of the Euroregion

The Siret–Prut–Nistru Euroregion is located in Romania and Moldova. The administrative center is Iași. This Euroregion was founded in 2002.

== Largest cities ==
- Romania: Iași (316,000), Bacău (175.921), Piatra Neamț (104,914), Focşani (101,854), Vaslui (70,267), Bârlad (78,633), Roman (69,483) and Onești (51,681)
- Republic of Moldova: Chișinău (593,800), Bălți (127,600), Tighina (97,027), Tiraspol (159,163)
