= Pomerania Euroregion =

Transnational co-operation structure

The Pomerania euroregion or Euroregion Pomerania was set up in 1995 as one of the euroregions, thought to connect regions divided between states of the European Union. The name is taken from the region of Pomerania, yet the euroregion is of a different shape than the historical region. It comprises German Western Pomerania and Uckermark, as well as Polish Zachodniopomorskie.

== Gallery ==
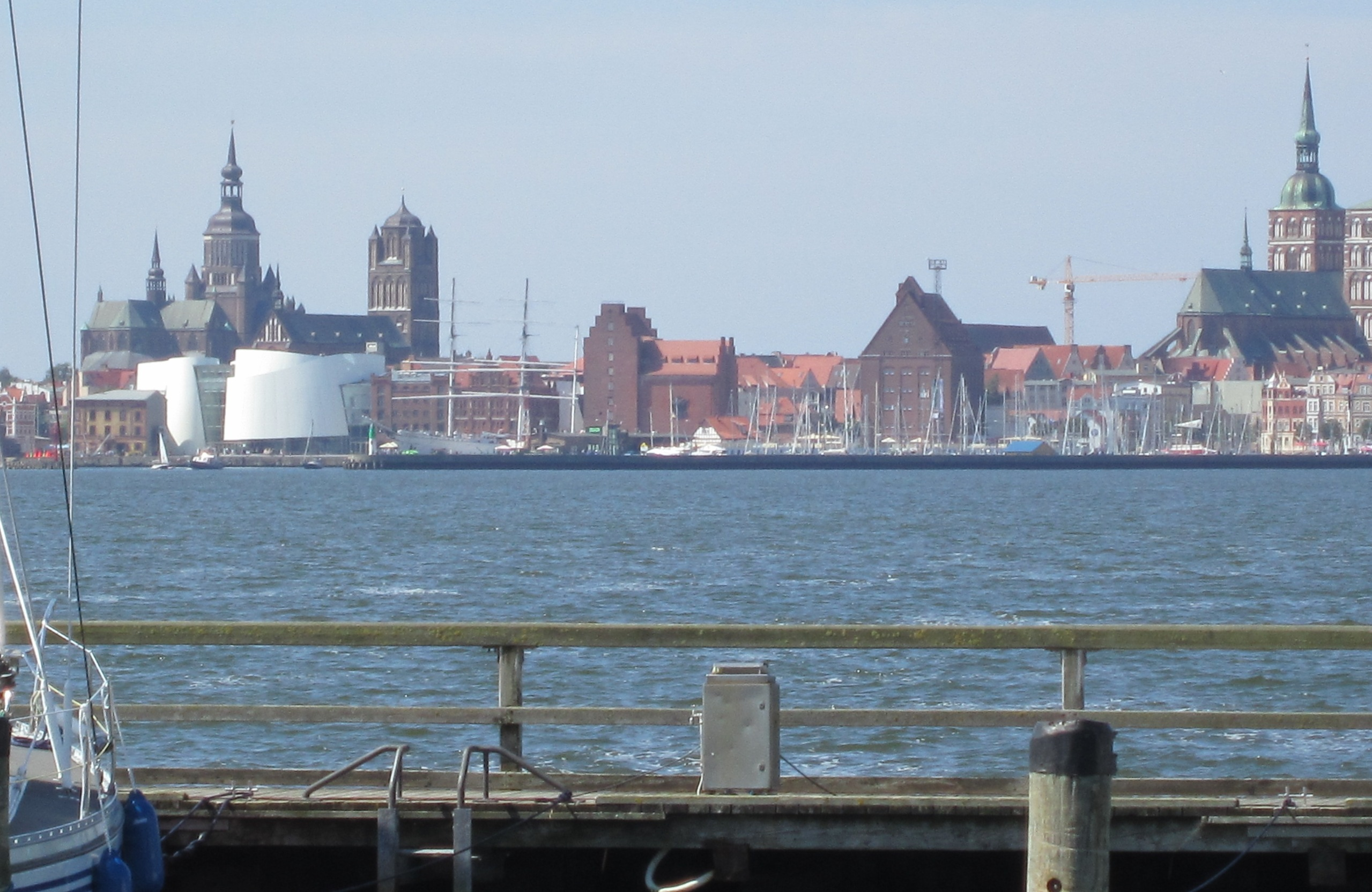
Stralsund, one of the German member cities of the Pomerania Euroregion

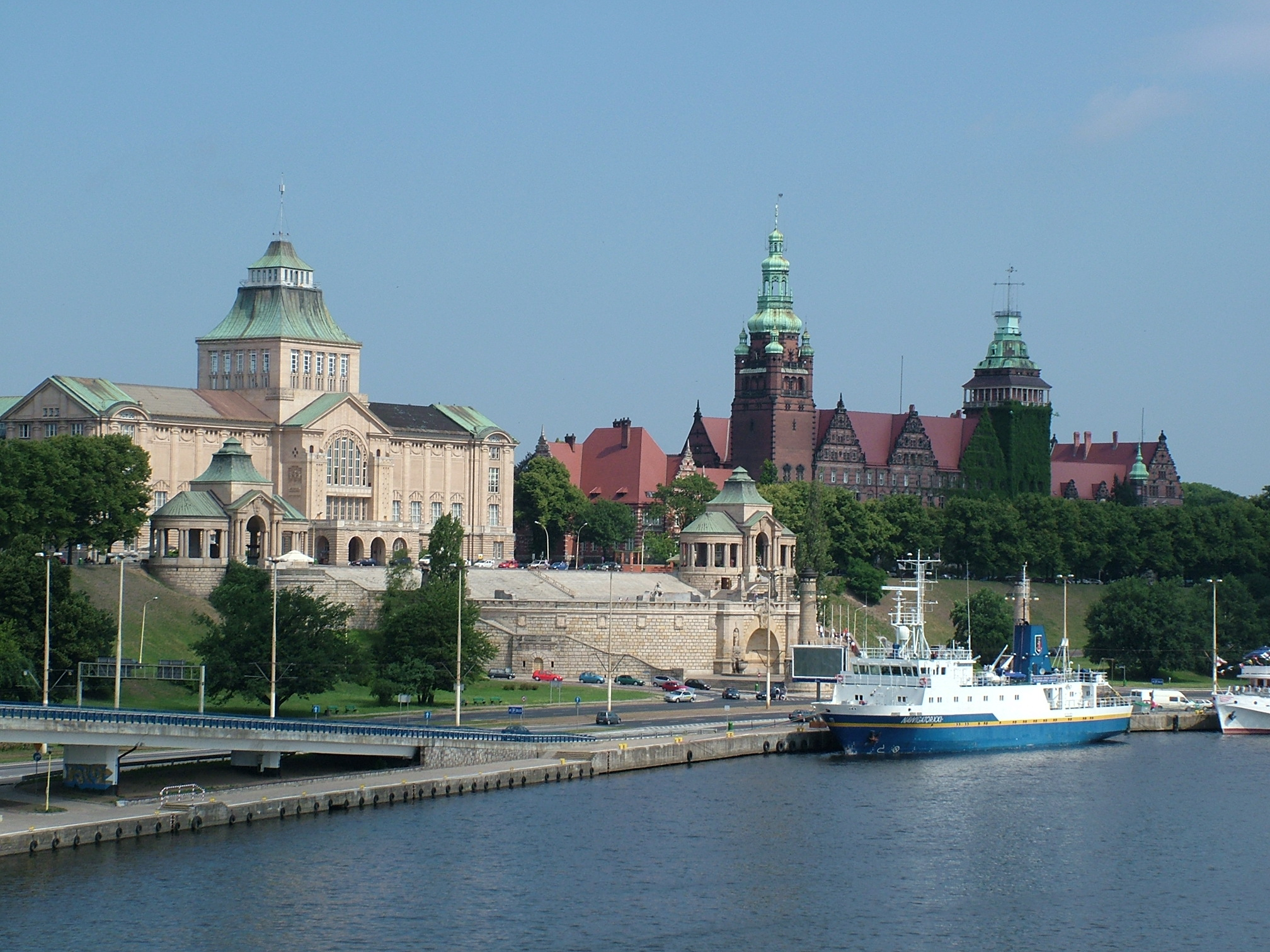
Szczecin, one of the Polish member cities of the Pomerania Euroregion

== See also ==
- List of euroregions

== Sources ==
- Falk Blask, Eléne Babayan, a project of Humboldt-Universität zu Berlin / Institut für Europäische Ethnologie, Dominikanerkloster Prenzlau / Kulturzentrum und Museum, Universität der Künste zu Berlin / Institut Kunst im Kontext, Staatliche Museen zu Berlin / Museum Europäischer Kulturen, Europa an der Grenze: Ost Odra, West Oder, (Berliner Blätter; No. 30: Sonderheft), Münster/Westfalen: Lit-Verlag, 2003, p. 14, ISBN 3-8258-6873-7, ISBN 978-3-8258-6873-4
- Karin Pieper, Regionalpolitik in Ungarn und Polen: Zwei Staaten im EU-Beitrittsprozess, Wiesbaden: VS, Verlag für Sozialwissenschaften, 2006, (Forschungen zur europäischen Integration; vol. 16), p. 179, simultaneously: Osnabrück, Univ., Diss., 2004. ISBN 3-531-14575-4, ISBN 978-3-531-14575-4
