= Euroregion Beskydy =

Euroregion in Poland, Czechia, and Slovakia

The Euroregion Beskidy (Polish) or Euroregion Beskydy (Czech) is a Euroregion joining parts of the Poland, Czech Republic and Slovakia. It was created on 9 June 2000.

== Main Cities ==
- (Poland) Bielsko-Biała
- (Czech Republic) Frýdek-Místek
- (Slovakia) Žilina
