= Danube–Drava–Sava Euroregion =

The Danube–Drava–Sava Euroregion is a Euroregion comprising areas of the countries of Bosnia and Herzegovina, Croatia and Hungary. It was established in 1998. The president of the organization is Ferenc Kékes (Hungarian: Kékes Ferenc).

== Areas ==
=== Bosnia and Herzegovina ===
- Brčko District
- Posavina County
- Tuzla Canton
- Tuzla Municipality
- Chamber of Commerce of the Tuzla Region

=== Croatia ===
- Brod-Posavina County
- Koprivnica-Križevci County
- Osijek-Baranja County
- Požega-Slavonia County
- Virovitica-Podravina County
- Vukovar-Srijem County
- City of Koprivnica
- City of Osijek
- City of Požega
- City of Vukovar
- Croatian Chamber of Commerce

=== Hungary ===
- Baranya County
- Somogy County
- City of Pécs
- City of Szekszárd
- Pécs-Baranya Chamber of Commerce and Industry
