= Arc Manche =

Arc Manche (French: arc, "arch"; and La Manche, "the English Channel") was a partnership between territories in France and the United Kingdom bordering the Channel. Its purposes were to advocate the shared interests of this area and to promote Franco-British co-operation. It enabled local stakeholders to share best practices and to consult each other when they faced common issues, especially in the maritime area. The co-operation network also provided a vehicle to drive large-scale bi-national projects, such as CAMIS, using European funds.

Created in 1996, the network was relaunched in 2003. With the withdrawal of the United Kingdom from the European Union, its activities ceased.

== Background ==
=== Geography ===
The English Channel is one of the world's busiest shipping lanes, primarily because of its strategic location as the entry/exit door to the European Union. It links the Atlantic Ocean with the North Sea, which generates considerable flows in people and goods, and makes it one of the main exchange zones in Europe.

It engenders a concentration of maritime opportunities, but also risks, which explains the co-operation between French and British local authorities in areas like maritime security, marine pollution prevention or the preservation of biodiversity.

This area is 112,519 km^{2} including the Channel Islands.

=== Demographics ===
The area's total population was 17,503,211 inhabitants in 2002, of which 5,445,000 resided in the United Kingdom and 12,058,211 in France.

=== Economy ===
Total GDP (1998–2000): 364,829 million Euros

GDP per capita (1998–2000): 20,395 Euros

The economic structure of the area is heterogeneous: Northern France is a highly industrialised area, whereas the prosperous South East of England economy relies more on high tech services and the tourism sector. The western part of the area in both France and Great Britain (Brittany, Lower Normandy and Cornwall) has a more rural economy relying on agriculture and tourism. Fishing is also an important activity in some parts of the area. There are 18 maritime zones and 50 important fishing ports in the area.

Tourism is a structuring activity for the area: in 2004, about 84 million tourists travelled within the Channel area. 32 sites are inscribed on the list of UNESCO World Heritage Sites, including the Jurassic Coast, Mont Saint-Michel, Stonehenge and the city of Le Havre.

== The Channel Arc Manche partnership ==
=== Aims ===
The promotion of the Channel Arc Manche co-operation network originates from two main concerns:

1. To develop the recognition of the Channel Arc among political and institutional stakeholders, be they private, local, national or European. This entails interventions at the national and European levels, the reinforcement of a common strategic vision to be able to have influence on the European regional policy, and for the specificities of this maritime space to be taken into account.
2. To promote and intensify Franco-British co-operation by constituting a stakeholders' network on coastal and maritime issues, by encouraging co-operation in areas of common interest, by supporting exchanges in economic, social, cultural and administrative realms.

=== Timeline ===
2001–2002: consultation of local executives concerning the revival of the Channel Arc Manche.

20 March 2003: Common declaration, signed by the 5 French Regions bordering the Channel and 5 Southern England local authorities.

2005: Creation of the Channel Arc Manche Assembly: Alain Le Vern, President of the Haute-Normandie Region, is elected chairman and Brad Watson, councillor of West Sussex County Council becomes vice-chairman.

2004: Espace Manche Development Initiative project, which was elaborated within the framework of the Interreg European programme.

2006: Following the lobbying efforts of the Channel Arc Manche Assembly towards the European Union, the French and British territories bordering the Channel become fully eligible to the cross-border cooperation programmes. First Conference of the Channel Arc Manche Assembly at Fontwell Park (West Sussex). Presentation of the Channel area strategic vision, elaborated within the framework of the EMDI project.

2007: Creation of the Channel's federation of regional and local ports in Saint-Brieuc. Brad Watson becomes President of the Channel Arc Manche Assembly.

June 2008: Publication of the book "Channel Spaces, a world within Europe", edited by Pascal Buléon and Louis Shurmer-Smith.

December 2008: Conference of the Channel Arc Manche Assembly in Folkestone, with discussion about coastal zones' adjustment to climate change.

June 2009: Approval of the CAMIS (Channel Arc Manche Integrated Strategy) project, co-financed by the Interreg IVA France (Channel) – England programme.

December 2009: Channel Arc Manche Conference in Rouen with the theme "What are the challenges for coastal economies in the Channel? Trends, current situations and local experience in coastal towns".

2011: Annual conference of the Channel Arc Manche in Fécamp with the theme "Tackling maritime pollution risks in the Channel for local authorities" parallel to the CAMIS project. Adpoption of the Fécamp Declaration.

=== Membership ===
Full members are the French Regions and the English local authorities bordering the Channel. Associate members are all other organisations located on this territory and willing to contribute to the achievement of the Channel Arc Manche Assembly's objectives.

Members of the Channel Arc Manche Partnership
Full members		Associate members
French regions	English local authorities	Associate members
Région Nord-Pas-de-Calais; Région Picardie (English: Picardy); Région Haut-Normandie (English: Upper Normandy); Région Basse-Normandie (English: Lower Normandy); Région Bretagne (English: Brittany)	Kent County Council; West Sussex County Council; Brighton and Hove City Council; Hampshire County Council; Southampton City Council; Devon County Council	East Sussex County Council; Isle of Wight County Council

=== Bureau ===
The Bureau consists of the chairman and the vice-chairman of the assembly. They are elected by full members for two years, the presidency alternating between the French and the British.

Assisted by the vice-chairman, the chairman is responsible for advocating the objectives of the Channel Arc Assembly towards European and national institutions, elaborating common declarations, and ensuring that the decisions of the assembly are implemented.

=== Channel Arc Manche Conference ===
An annual meeting takes place during the first week of July for the exchange of good practices and to identify potential areas of co-operation. The conference is attended by full and associate members, and is also open to other interested organisations.

=== Executive Committee ===
The executive committee consists of all the full members and takes the decisions necessary to achieve the objectives of the Channel Arc Manche Assembly. It meets at least twice a year and decisions are taken through consensus.

=== Secretariat ===
The Secretariat deals with day-to-day running, the preparation and the follow-up of work in the executive committee and the annual conference, as well as administering the website.

=== Finances ===
The Channel Arc Manche partnership does not hold its own budget. The means dedicated by its members to the co-operation network mostly consist of working time and limited logistic expenses. European structural funds are often requested to finance individual co-operation projects within the Channel area.

== Projects ==
European funding, in particular the European Regional Development Fund, enables the Interreg co-operation programmes to support Franco-British co-operation projects of different scales. Between 2007 and 2013, 173 million Euros were allocated to Franco-British co-operation in the Channel area. Along with all other projects, the Channel Arc Manche partnership supports in particular two large and structural projects for the area: the Espace Manche Development Initiative (EMDI) and the Channel Arc Manche Integrated Strategy (CAMIS).

=== Espace Manche Development Initiative ===
The EMDI project, which gathered 22 partners between 2004 and 2008, aimed to develop and reinforce Franco-British co-operation within the Channel area. 48% of its budget was co-funded by the Interreg IIIB co-operation programme. It led to:

- The elaboration of a strategic vision document for the Channel area.
- The development of pilot co-operation actions : tourism, fishing, fisheries, coastal zones integrated management, maritime security, intermodal transport, higher education, research and development, technology transfers.
- The publication of the bilingual book Channel Spaces, a World Within Europe in 2007.
- The maps of the Channel area strategic vision.
- The Crosschannel Atlas, a Franco-British research collaboration about the Channel area.
- The recognition by EU institutions of the Channel area as a fully pertinent area for cross-border cooperation.

=== Channel Arc Manche Integrated Strategy ===
The CAMIS project (2009–2013), with a budget of 3.3 million Euros, half of which was funded by the Interreg IVA France (Channel) England programme, gathered ten local authorities from Britain and France and nine other organisations.

Its aims were:

- Promote the specificity of the Channel area in the local, national and European spheres
- Improve the knowledge of this area in various realms (geography, economy, biology, etc.)
- Develop intermodal transport
- Develop innovation, workforce development, economic growth.
- Create common tools to facilitate and improve the management of certain aspects of the maritime zone such as the Cross-channel Forum or the Common Resources Centre.
- Ultimately, develop and implement an integrated maritime strategy in the Channel area.
