= Biharia Euroregion =

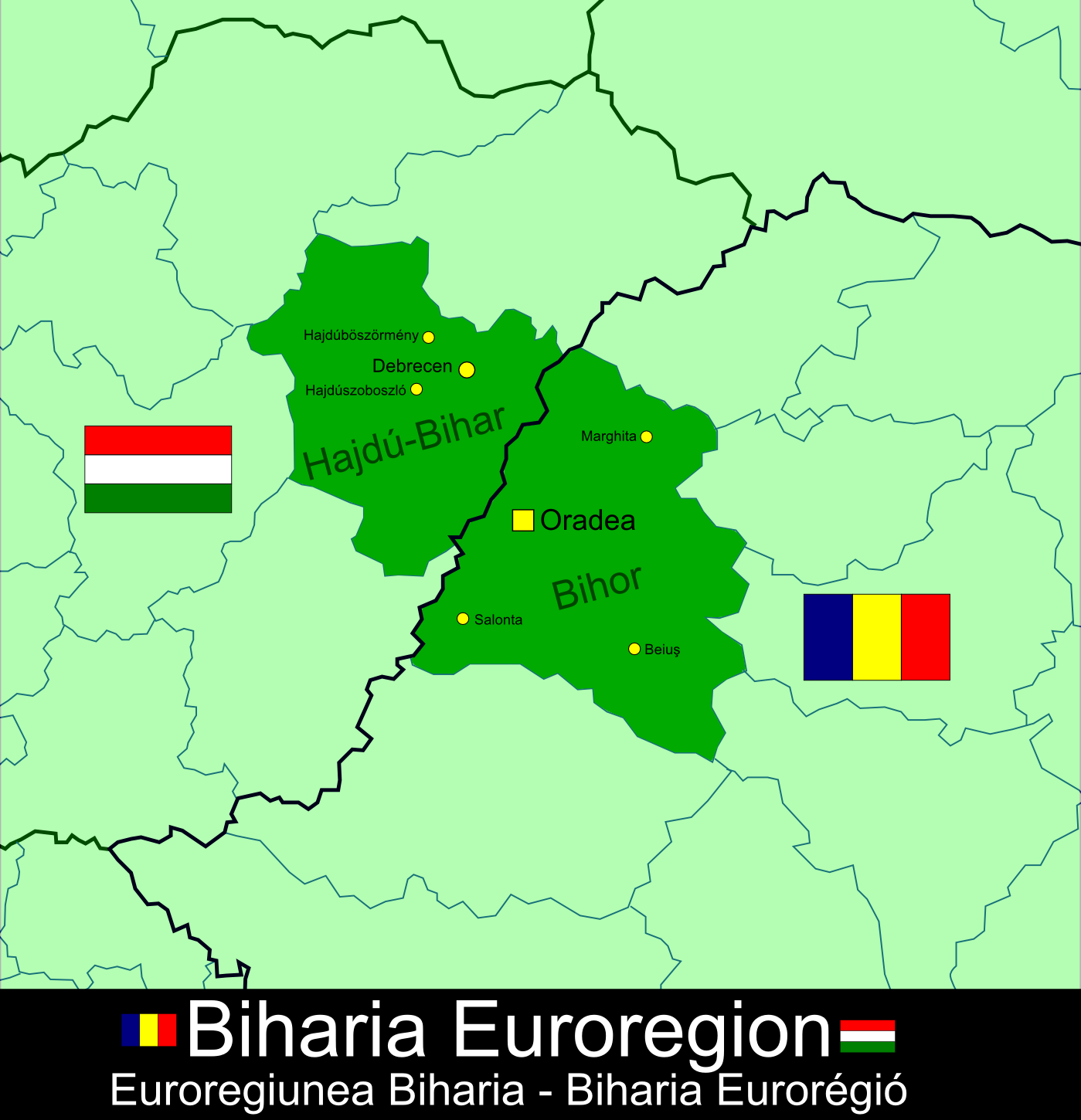
Map of Biharia Euroregion

Biharia euroregion (Romanian: Euroregiunea Biharia, Hungarian: Biharia Eurorégió) is a euroregion located in Romania and Hungary. It was established in 2002 by the counties of Bihor and Hajdú-Bihar, as "they experience challenges that can be solved together more easily." The authorities of the counties intended to "significantly enhance the number of bilateral projects".

== Administration ==
- Biharia euroregion is composed of:
  - Bihor County in Romania
  - Hajdú-Bihar County in Hungary
