= European grouping of territorial cooperation =

A European grouping of territorial cooperation (EGTC) is a European Union level form of transnational cooperation between countries and local authorities with legal personality. EU Council Regulation 1082/2006 of 5 July 2006 forms its legal basis. As of April 2021, 78 EGTCs are in existence.

== Composition ==
An EGTC must have members from at least two EU member states (or 1 member and 1 neighbouring country or OCT) and members can include

- Member States or authorities at national level,
- regional or local authorities,
- public undertakings or bodies governed by public law,
- undertakings entrusted with operations of services of general economic interest, or
- national, regional or local authorities, or bodies or undertakings from non-EU countries.

The composition and powers of an EGTC have to be described in a convention subject to approval by Member States with members in the body.

The organs of an EGTC must at least include:

(a) an assembly, made up of representatives of its members.
(b) a director, who represents the EGTC and acts on its behalf.

The convention can provide for additional organs. It also must specify the extent of the territory under which it may execute its tasks.

== Powers and functions ==
When an EGTC is formed its convention has to define the objectives and powers of the entity and it is limited by the respective powers of its members under their national law. The law applicable to the interpretation and enforcement of the convention is the law of the Member State where the EGTC has its registered office.

The assembly of an EGTC approves an annual budget containing a component on running costs and, if necessary, an operational component. The EGTC or its Members are liable for any debts incurred.

An EGTC cannot exercise police and regulatory powers or powers in justice and foreign policy.

According to the regulation if an EGTC carries out any activity violating a Member State's provisions on public policy, public security, public health or public morality, or violates the public interest of a Member State, a competent body of that Member State may prohibit such activity on its territory or require those members which have been formed under its law to withdraw from the EGTC unless the EGTC ceases the activity in question. Such prohibitions can not be used as an arbitrary means to limit cooperation under the regulation and are subject to judicial review.

== See also ==
- Euroregion
- European economic interest grouping
- Interreg
