= List of regions of the Netherlands =

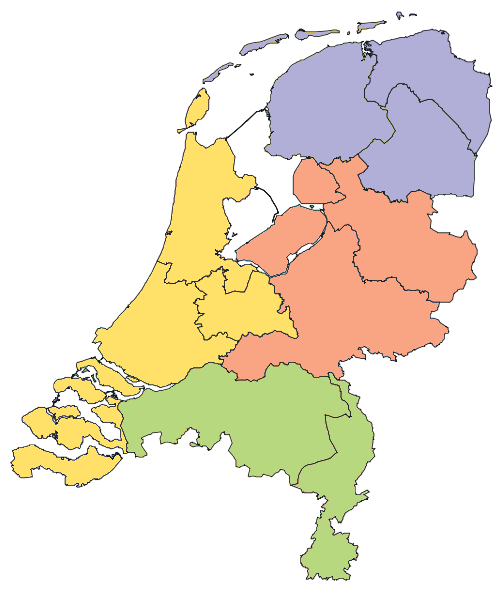
NUTS-1 regions of the Netherlands

The regions of the Netherlands provides links to both regions and subregions of the Netherlands.

== Regions ==
The regions of the Netherlands are divided into the North, South, West and East Netherlands.

=== Official regions ===
Many regions in the Netherlands are officially defined by certain regulations of organizations.

==== First level NUTS of the European Union ====
NUTS-1 Regional divisions as used by the European Union:

- Region NL1 (North Netherlands): Groningen, Friesland, Drenthe
- Region NL2 (East Netherlands): Overijssel, Gelderland, Flevoland
- Region NL3 (West Netherlands): Utrecht, North Holland, South Holland, Zeeland
- Region NL4 (South Netherlands): North Brabant, Limburg

==== Unofficial multi-country regions ====
- De Duffelt
- Euregio Enschede-Gronau
- Euregio Benelux Middengebied
- Ems Dollart Region
- Frisia
- Kempen
- Maasland
- Meuse-Rhine Euroregion
- Rhine-Meuse-North Euroregion
- Rhine-Waal Euroregion
- Scheldemond Euroregion

==== Unofficial multi-province regions ====
- Bible Belt
- De Biesbosch
- Bollenstreek
- Gelderse Valley
- Groene Hart
- Holland
- Hondsrug
- Peel
- Rijnland
- Rivierengebied
- Schelde- en Maasdelta
- Utrecht Hill Ridge
- Vechtstreek
- Vijfheerenlanden
- West Frisian Islands

==== Inter-province metropolitan areas ====
- Randstad (North Holland, South Holland, Utrecht and Flevoland)
- Stadsregio Arnhem Nijmegen (Gelderland and Limburg)

== Subregions ==
The subregions (Dutch: streek or landstreek (plural: (land)streken), literally translating to a combination of 'land/country area/region') are non-administrative area in the Netherlands that can be demarcated on grounds of cohesion with regard to culture or landscape. This means that a landstreek is not bound by provincial or municipal boundaries. Below is a list of all Dutch landstreken with the province(s) in which they are located mentioned between brackets.

=== A ===
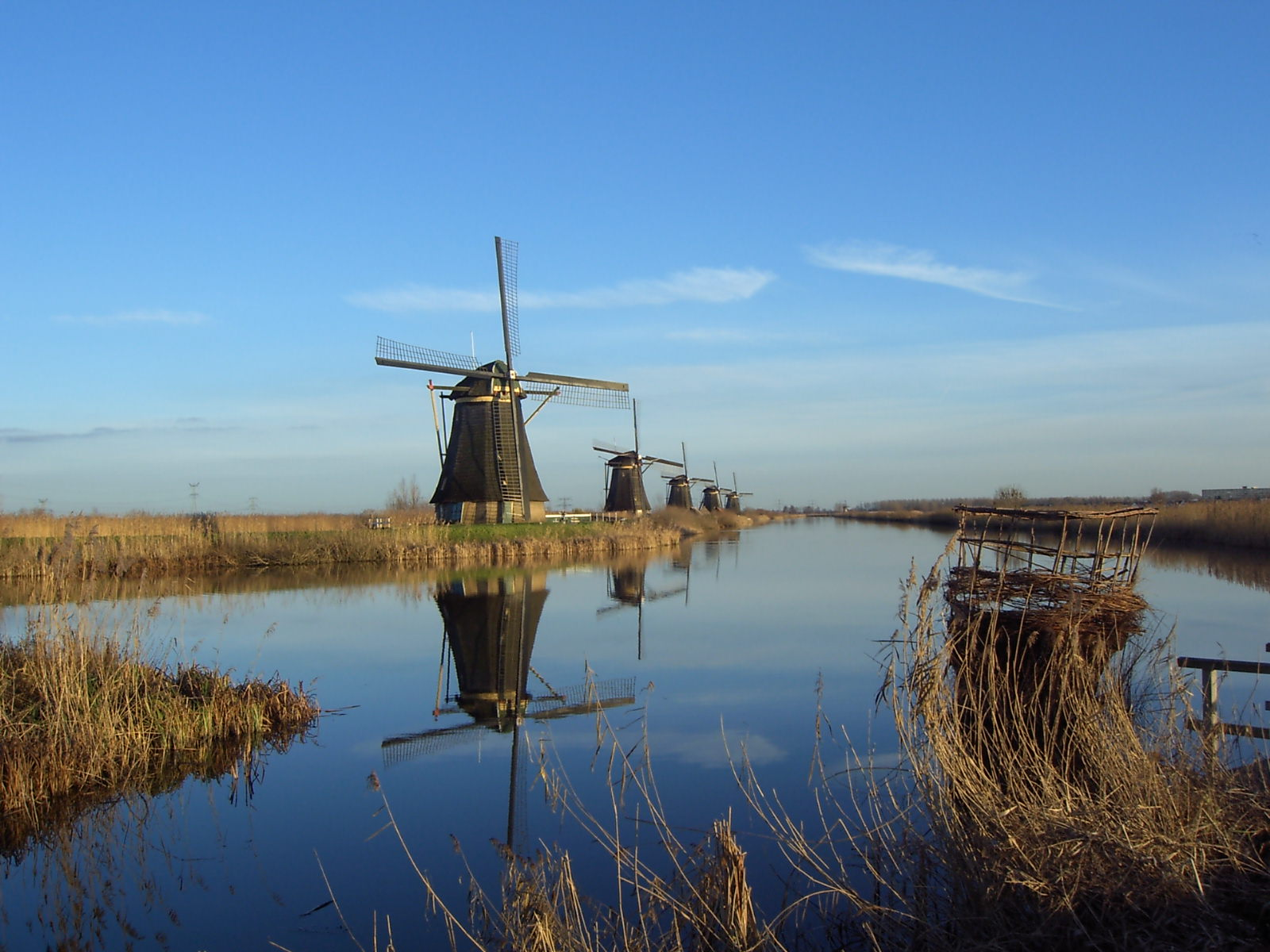
Some of the windmills of Kinderdijk in the northwest of the Alblasserwaard

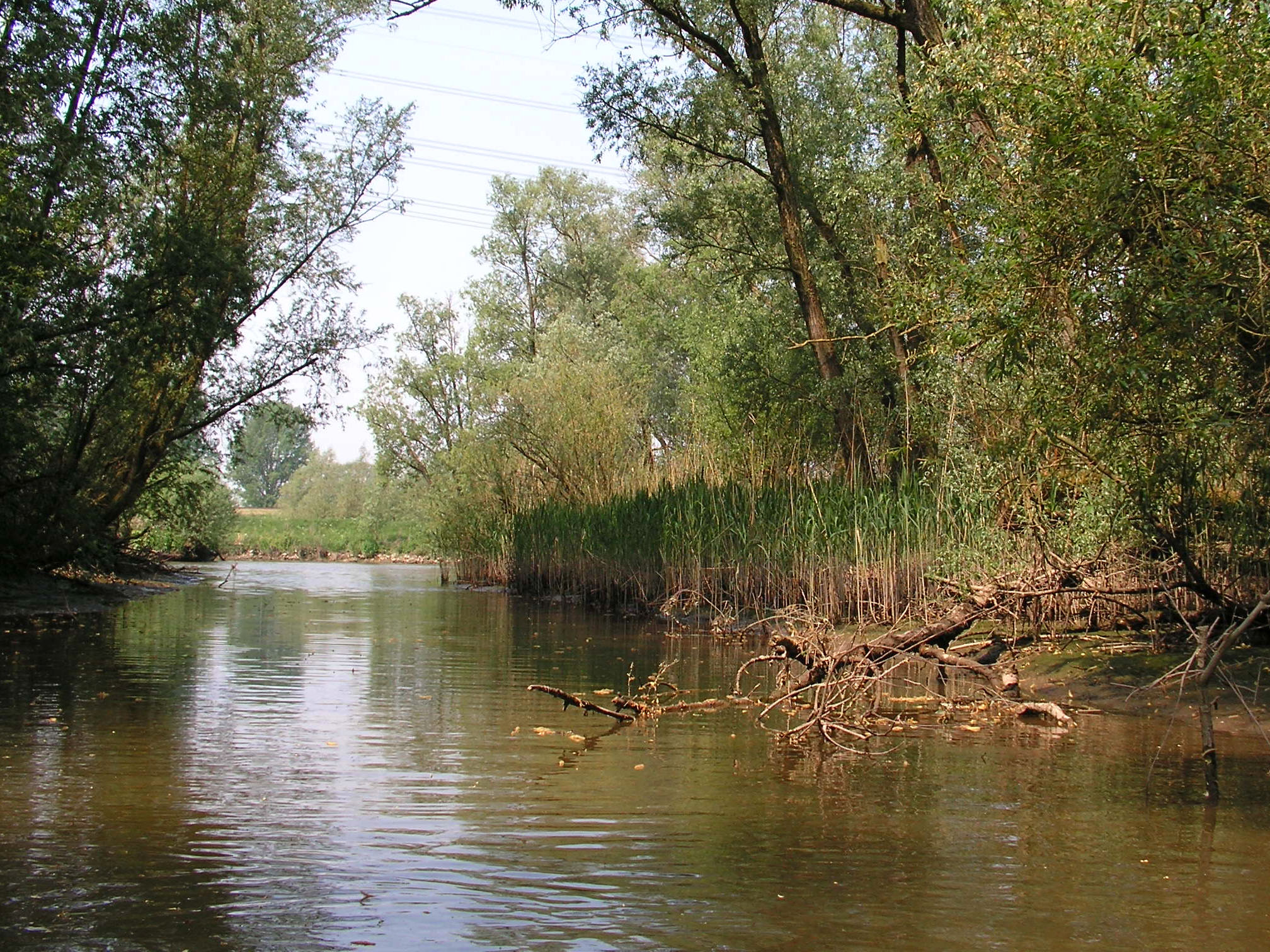
Hollandse Biesbosch near Dordrecht

- Achterhoek (Gelderland)
- Alblasserwaard (South Holland)
- Ameland (Friesland)
- Amstelland (North Holland)
- Metropolitan Region Amsterdam (North Holland)

=== B ===
- Baronie van Breda (North Brabant)
- Beemster (North Holland)
- Beijerland (South Holland)
- Betuwe (Gelderland)
- Het Bildt (Friesland)
- Bommelerwaard (Gelderland)
- Brabantse Biesbosch (North Brabant)
- Brabantse Stedenrij (North Brabant)
- Brabantse Wal (North Brabant)

=== D ===
- Delfland (South Holland)
- Dokkumer Wouden (Friesland)
- Drechtsteden (South Holland)
- Duurswold (Groningen)

=== E ===
- Eemland (Utrecht)
- Eemvallei (Utrecht)
- Eiland van Dordrecht (South Holland)
- Ellertsveld (Drenthe)

=== F ===
- Fivelingo (Groningen)
- Flevopolder (Flevoland)
- Friese Wouden (Friesland)

=== G ===
- Gaasterland (Friesland)
- Goeree-Overflakkee (South Holland)
- Gooi (North Holland)
- Gorecht (Groningen)
- De Graafschap (Gelderland)
- Graetheide (Limburg)
- Groninger Veenkoloniën (Groningen)

=== H ===
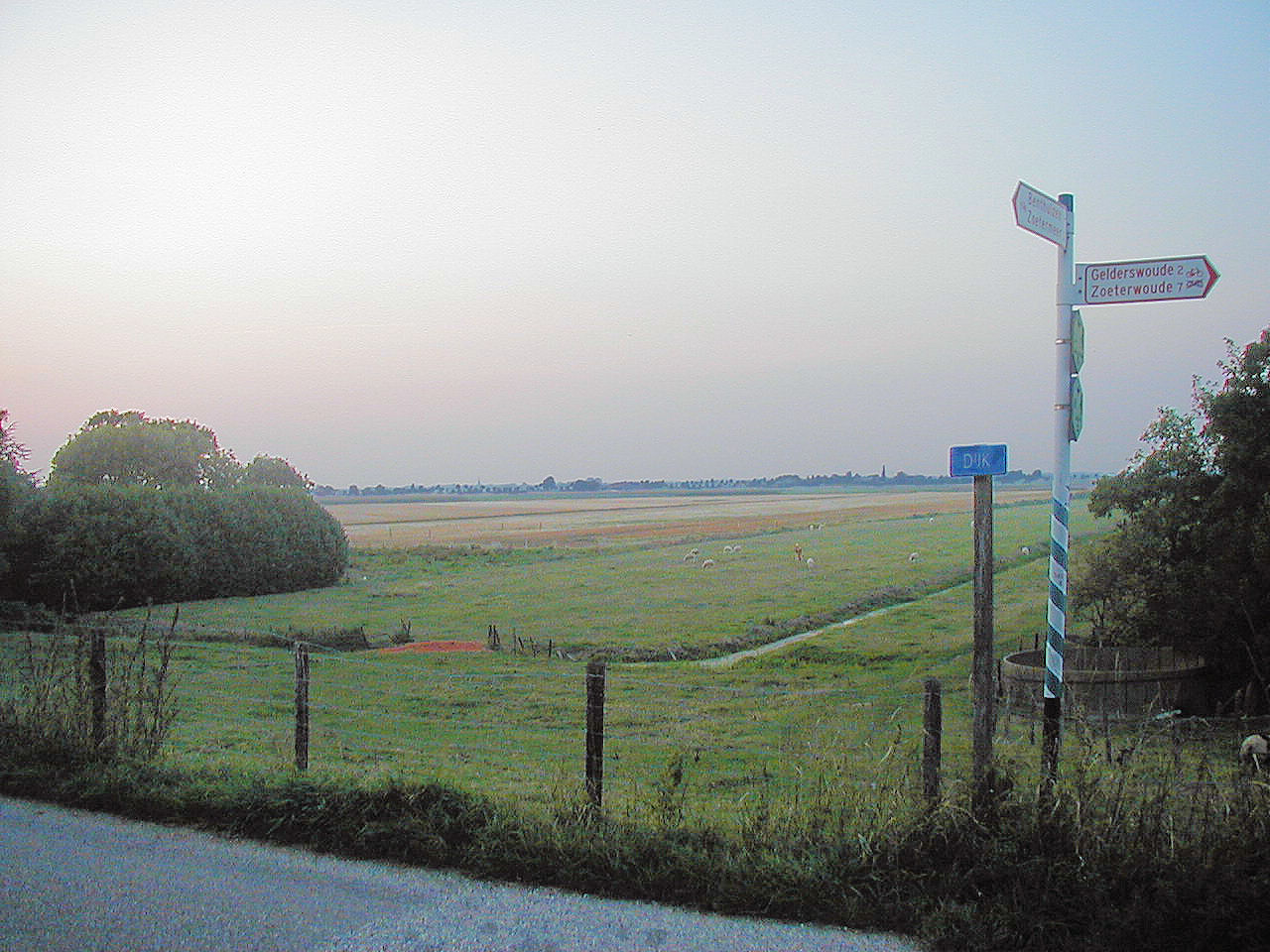
Quintessential landscape of the Holland region: Benthuizen polder, as viewed from a dike

- Haarlemmermeer (North Holland)
- Halfambt (Groningen)
- Heuvelland (Limburg)
- Hoeksche Waard (South Holland)
- Hollandse Biesbosch (South Holland)
- Hogeland (Groningen)
- Humsterland (Groningen)
- Hunsingo (Groningen)

=== I ===
- IJsselmonde (South Holland)
- IJsseldal (IJsselvallei) (Gelderland)
- Innersdijken (Groningen)

=== K ===
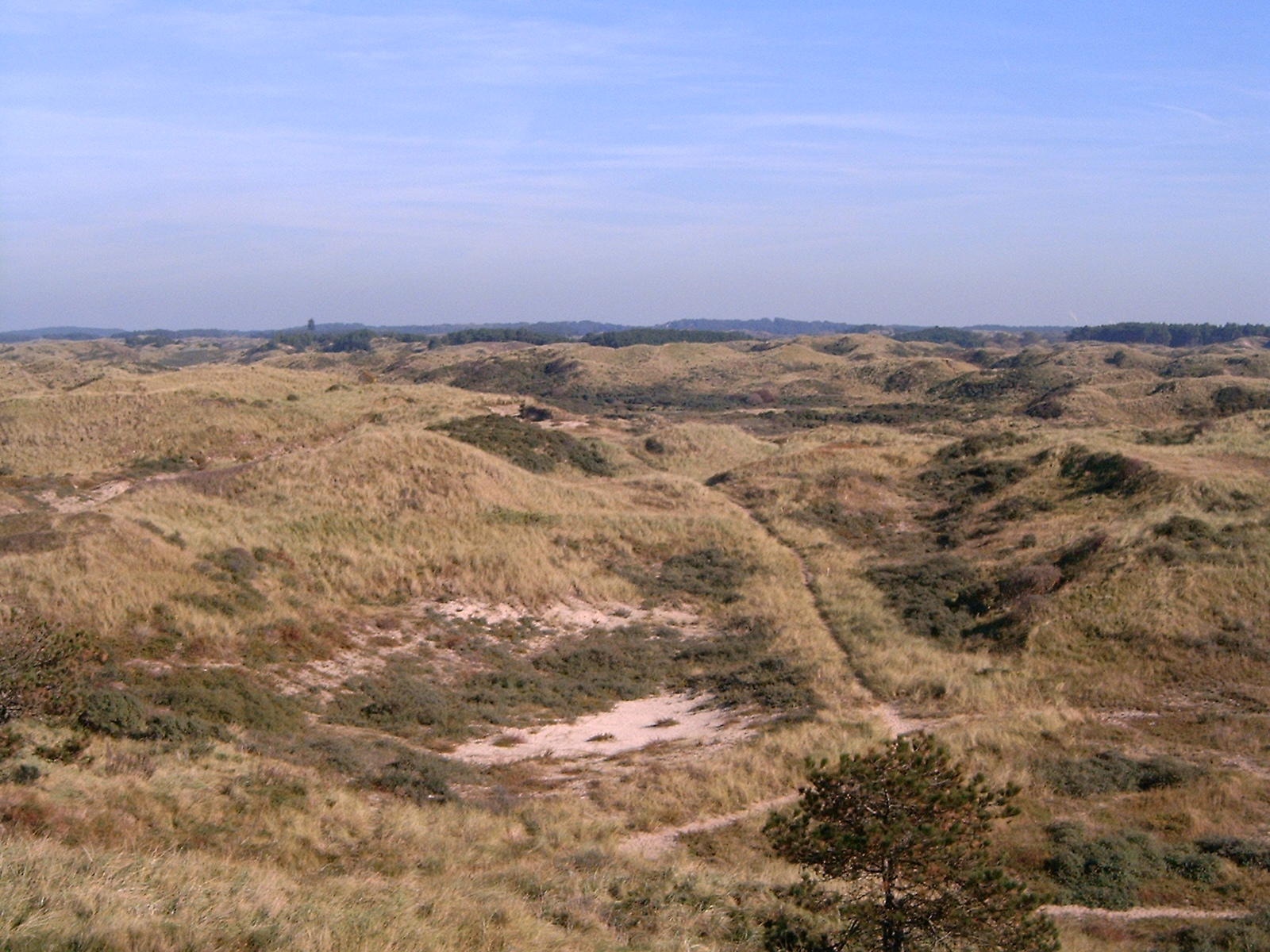
Dunes of Kennemerland

- Kampereiland (Overijssel)
- Kanaalstreek (Groningen)
- Kennemerland (North Holland)
- Kleistreek (Friesland)
- Kop van Noord-Holland (North Holland)
- Kop van Overijssel (Overijssel)
- Krimpenerwaard (South Holland)

=== L ===
- Land van Altena (North Brabant)
- Land van Cuijk (North Brabant)
- Land van Heusden (North Brabant)
- Land van Heusden en Altena (North Brabant)
- Land van Maas en Waal (Gelderland)
- Langewold (Groningen)
- Langstraat (North Brabant)
- Liemers (Gelderland)
- Lopikerwaard (Utrecht)

=== M ===
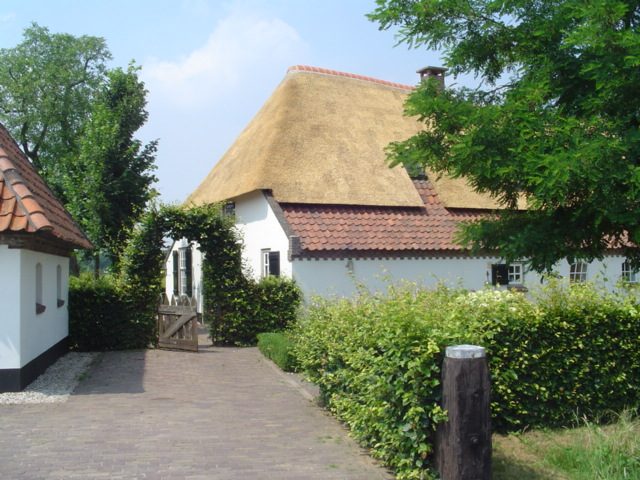
Farmhouse in Veghel, Meierij van 's-Hertogenbosch, North Brabant

- Maasland (North Brabant) (North Brabant)
- Maasplassen (Limburg)
- Marne (Groningen)
- Marnewaard (Groningen)
- Meierij van 's-Hertogenbosch (North Brabant)
- Menterne (Groningen)
- Mergelland (Limburg)
- Middag (Groningen)
- Midden-Limburg (Limburg)
- Midden-Zeeland (Zeeland)
- Middenveld (Drenthe)
- Montferland (Gelderland)

=== N ===
- Neder-Betuwe (Gelderland)
- Noord-Beveland (Zeeland)
- Noordenveld (Drenthe)
- Noordoostpolder (Flevoland)

=== O ===
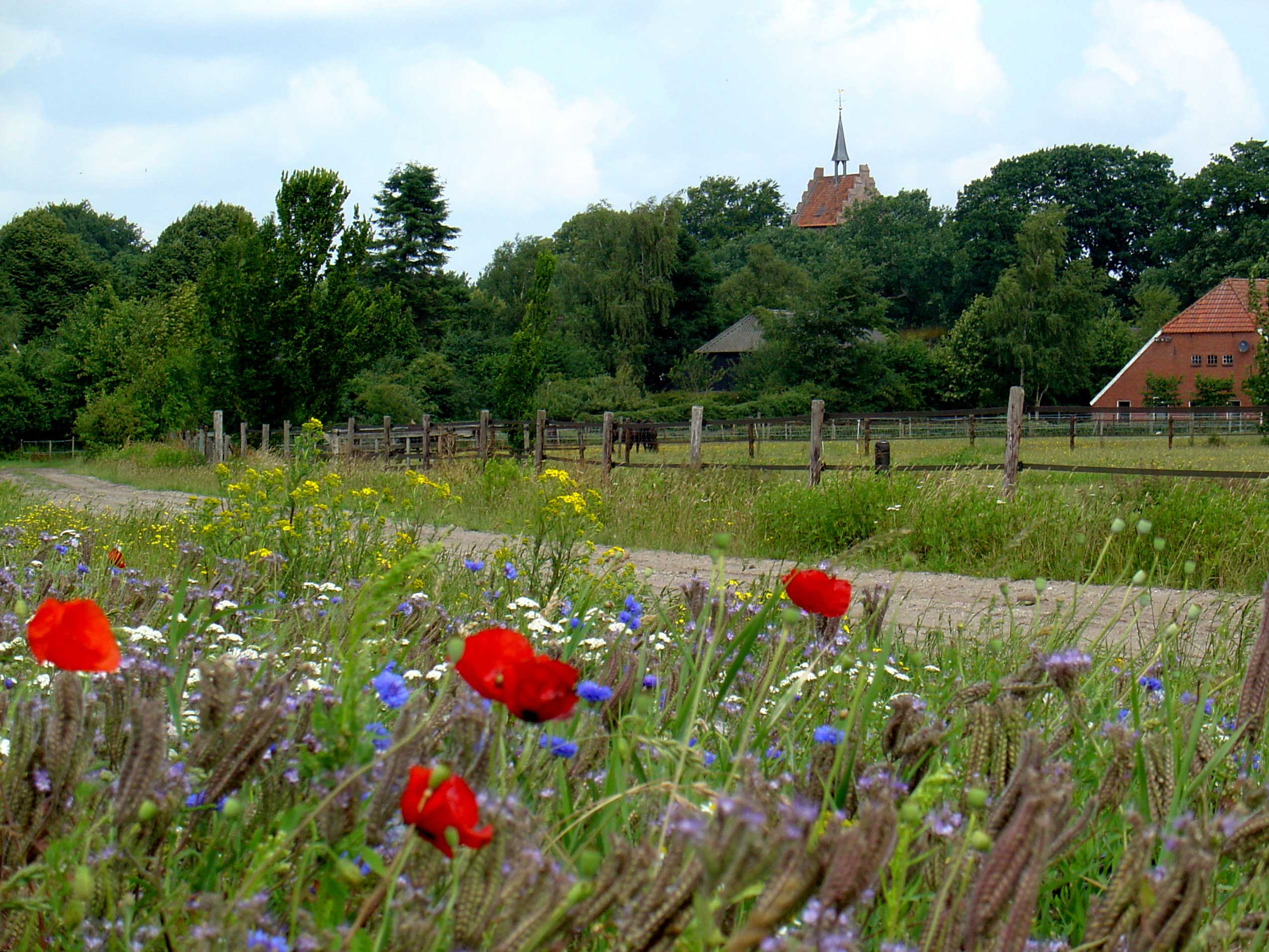
Town of Anloo in the Oostermoer landstreek, Drenthe

- Oldambt (Groningen)
- Ommelanden (Groningen)
- Oostelijk Flevoland (Flevoland)
- Oostelijke Mijnstreek (Limburg)
- Oosterambt (Groningen)
- Oostergo (Friesland)
- Oostermoer (Drenthe)
- Over-Betuwe (Gelderland)

=== P ===
- Plateau van Margraten (Limburg)
- Prins Alexanderpolder (South Holland)
- Purmer (North Holland)

=== R ===
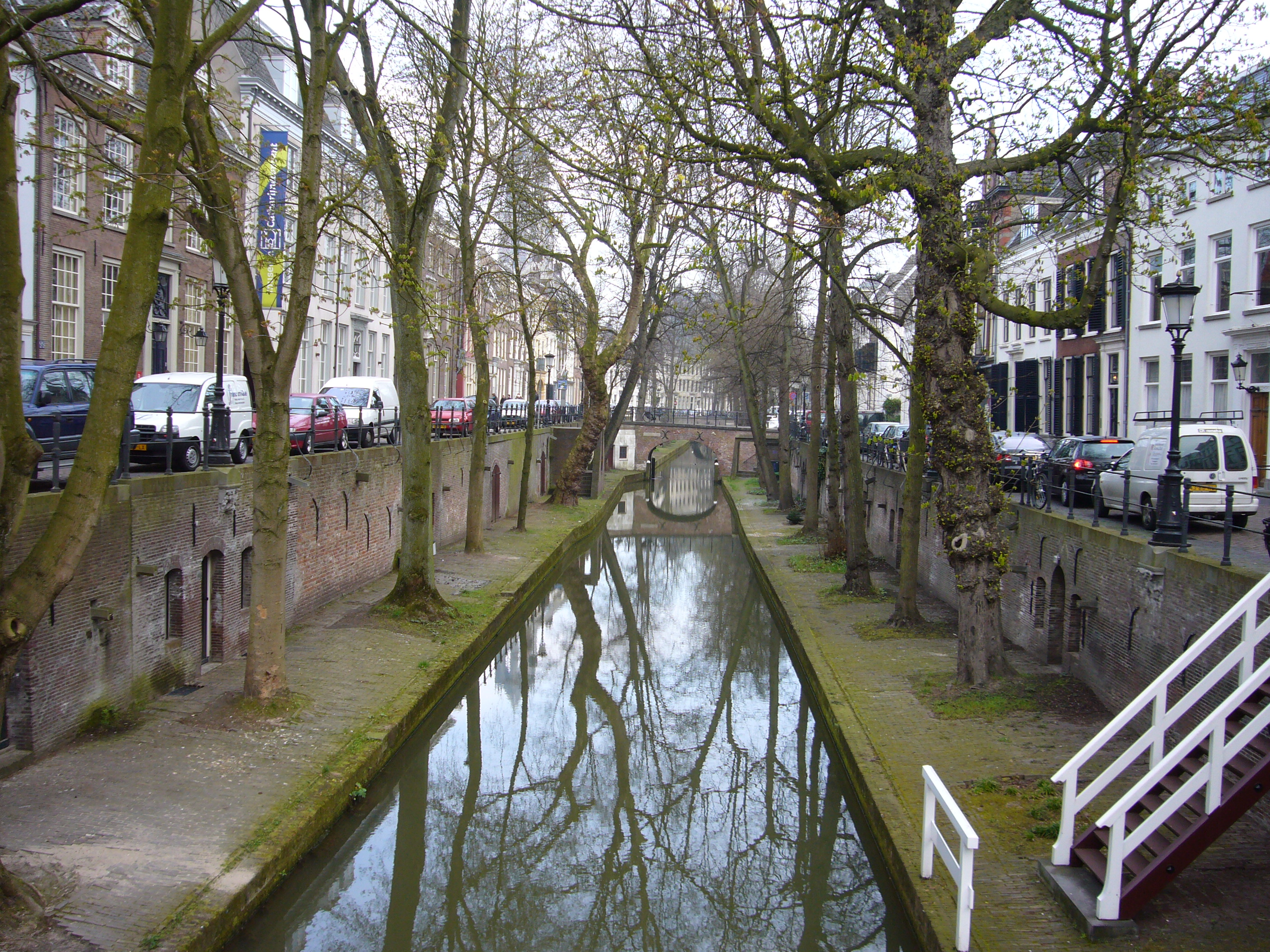
Canal in the City of Utrecht, part of the Randstad conurbation

- Rheiderland (Groningen)
- Rijk van Nijmegen (Gelderland)
- Rijnmond (South Holland)
- Rivierenland [nl] (Gelderland)
- Rolderdingspel (Drenthe)
- Rottumeroog (Groningen)
- Rottumerplaat (Groningen)

=== S ===
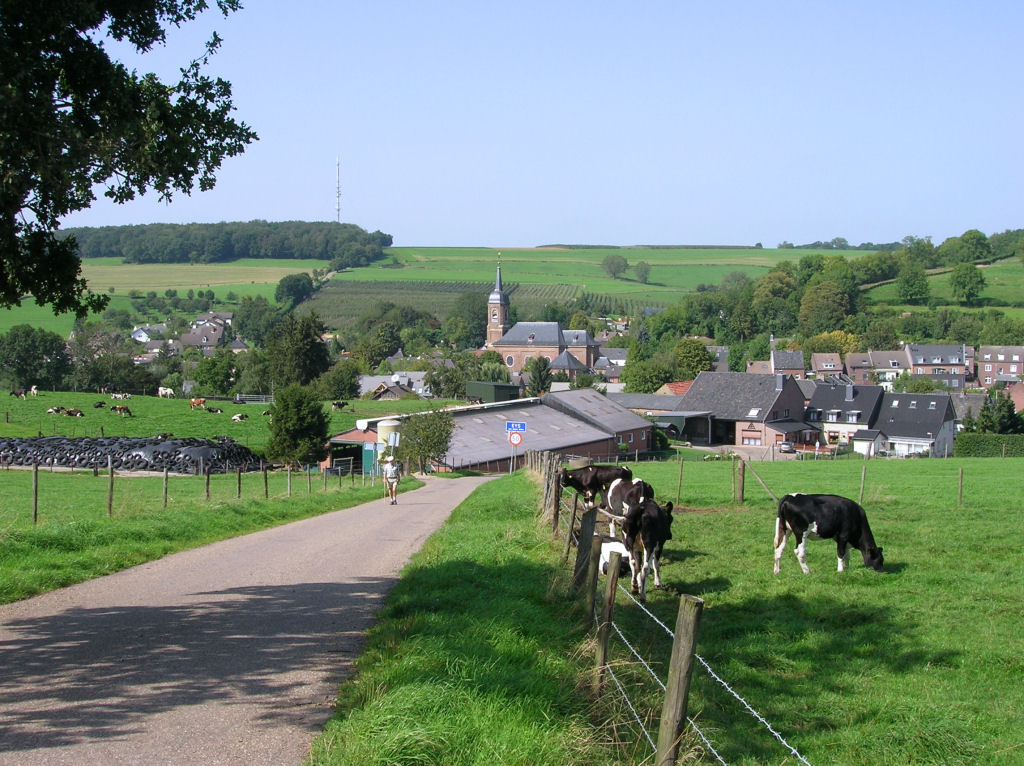
Hilly landscape and the town of Eys in South Limburg illustrating the a-typical Dutch landscape of the far-south of the Netherlands

- Salland (Overijssel)
- Schermer (North Holland)
- Schieland (South Holland)
- Schiermonnikoog (Friesland)
- Schouwen-Duiveland (Zeeland)
- Sint Philipsland (Zeeland)
- South Beveland (Zeeland)
- South Limburg (Limburg)
- Southern Flevoland (Flevoland)
- Stellingwerven (Friesland)
- Stichtse Lustwarande (Utrecht)
- De Streek (North Holland)

=== T ===
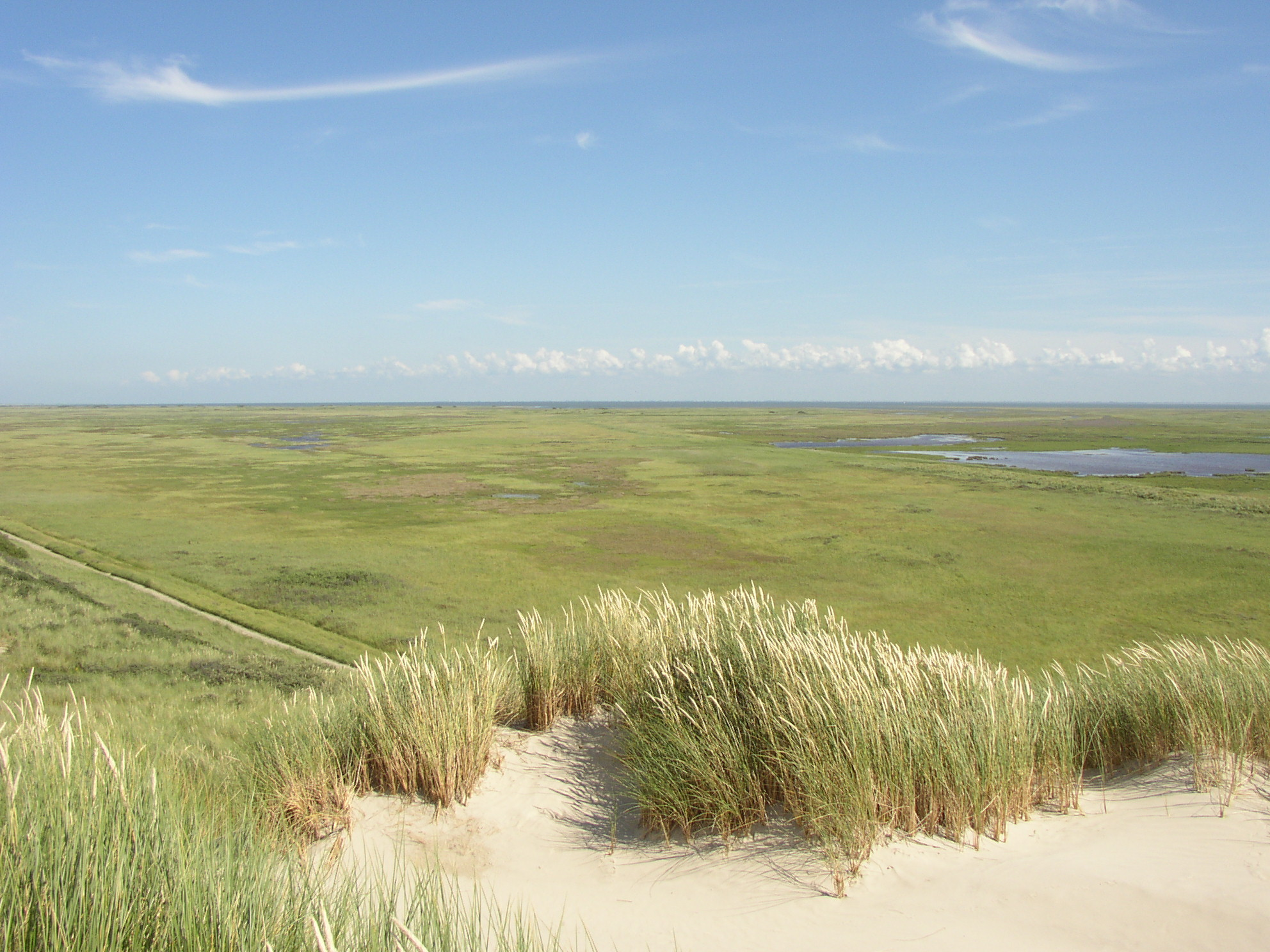
The Boschplaat nature area on the island of Terschelling, Wadden Islands, Friesland

- Terschelling (Friesland)
- Texel (North Holland)
- Tielerwaard (Gelderland)
- Tiengemeten (South Holland)
- Tholen (Zeeland)
- Twente (Overijssel)

=== U ===
- Upgo (Groningen)

=== V ===
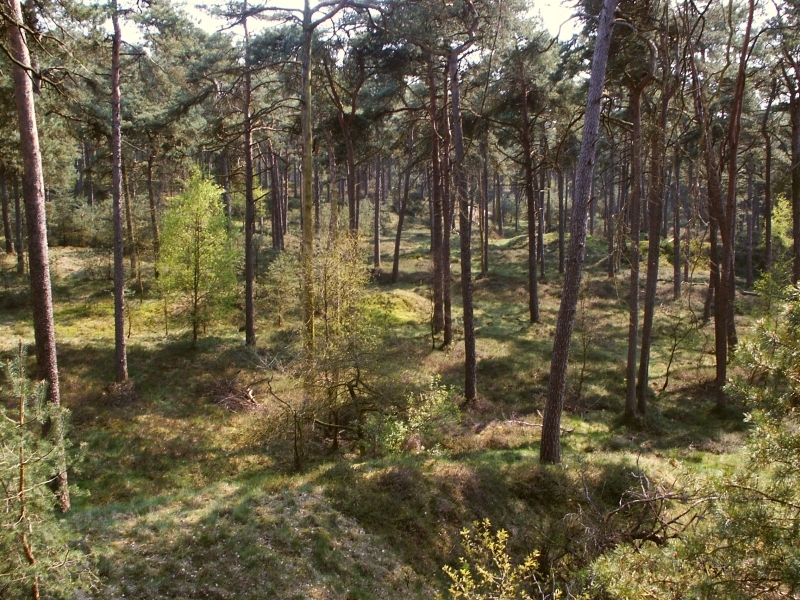
A forest in the geographically diverse Veluwe landstreek, Gelderland

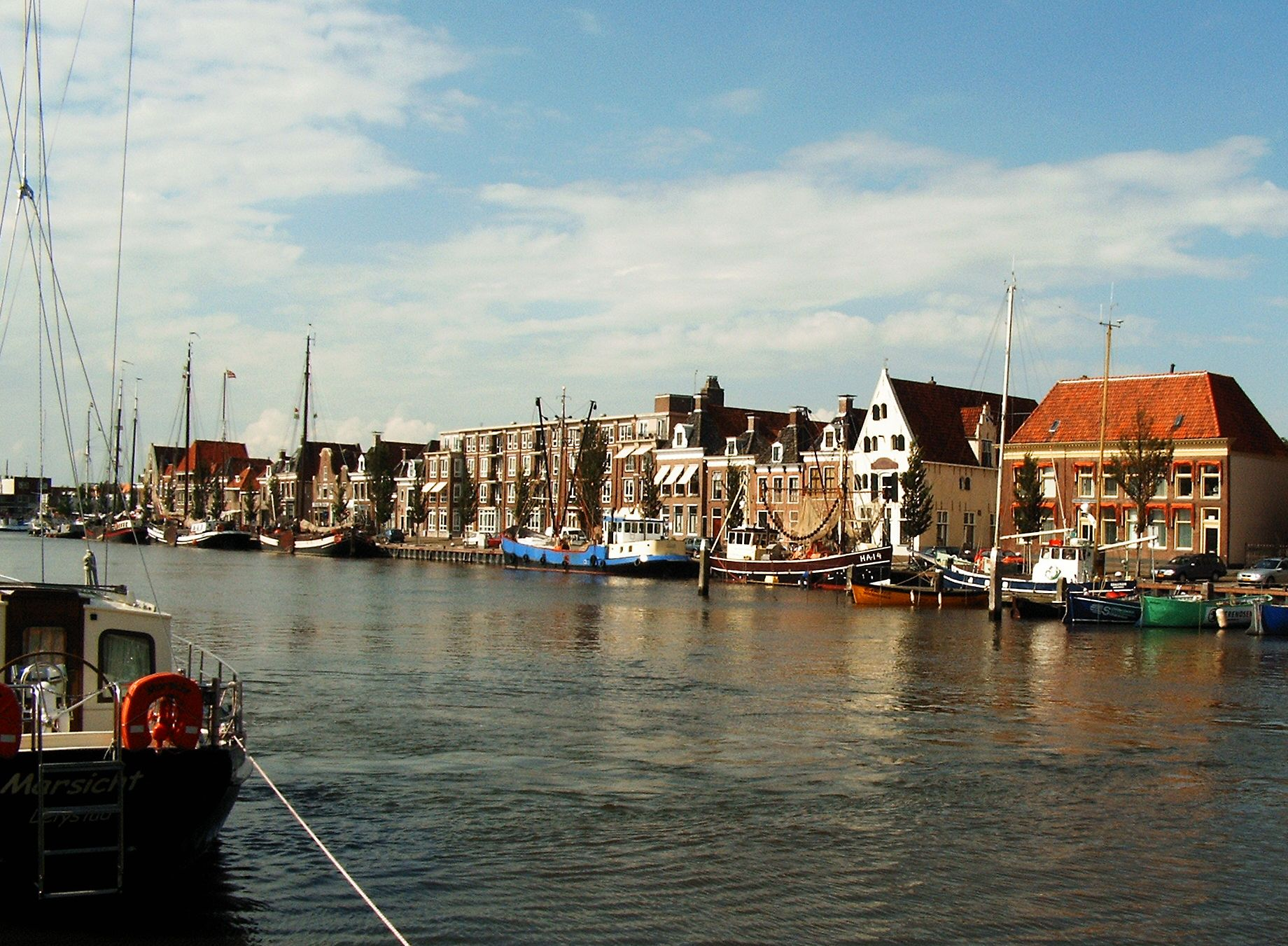
Town of Harlingen in the Westergo landstreek of Friesland

- Veluwe (Gelderland)
- Vlieland (Friesland)
- Voorne-Putten (South Holland)
- Vredewold (Groningen)

=== W ===
- Walcheren (Zeeland)
- Waterland (North Holland)
- West-Friesland (North Holland)
- Westelijke Mijnstreek (Limburg)
- Westergo (Friesland)
- Westerkwartier (Groningen)
- Westerlauwers Friesland (Friesland)
- Westerwolde (Groningen)
- Westland (South Holland)
- Wieringen (North Holland)
- Wieringermeer (North Holland)
- Wijdewormer (De Wormer) (North Holland)

=== Z ===
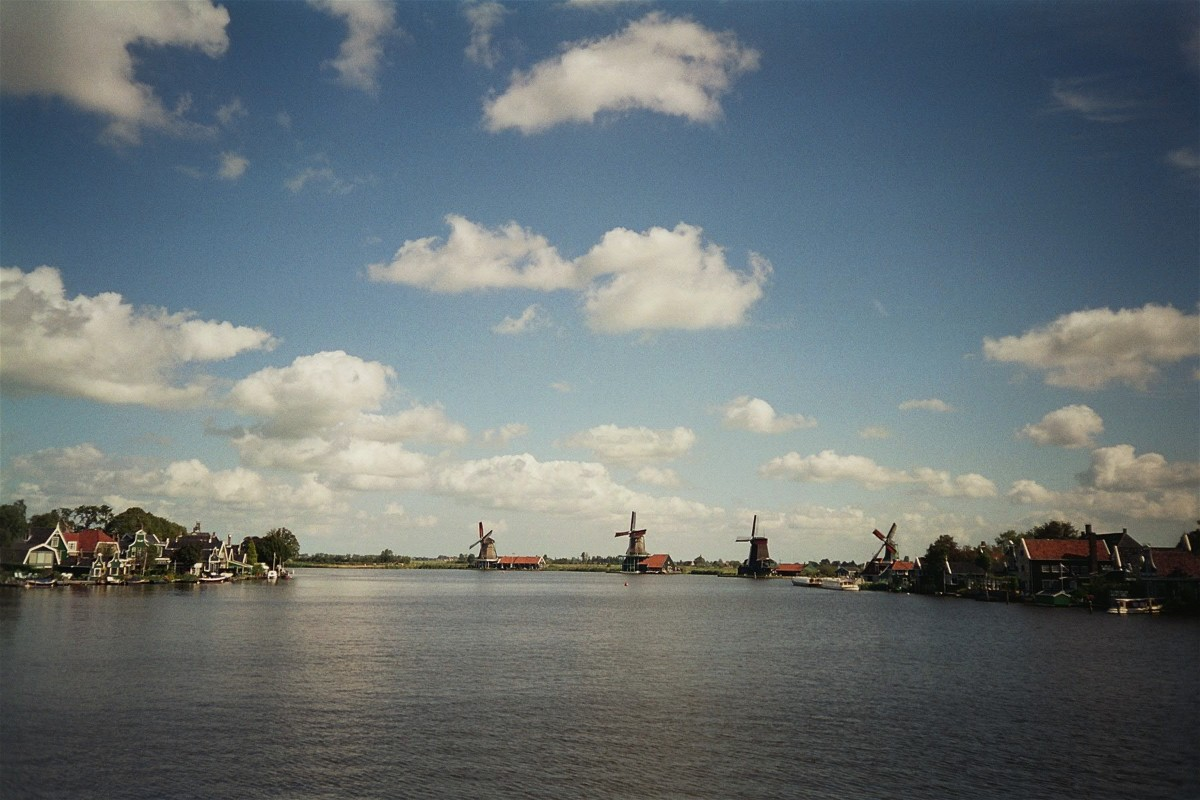
Windmills and the river Zaan, Zaanstreek, North Holland

- Zaanstreek (North Holland)
- Zeelandic Flanders (Zeeland)
- Zevenwouden (Friesland)
- Zoom (North Brabant)
- Zuidenveld (Drenthe)
- Zuiderduintjes (Groningen)
- Zuidplaspolder (South Holland)
- Zuidwesthoek (Friesland)
- Zwijndrechtse Waard (South Holland)
