= Ethnic minorities in Georgia =

Ethnic minorities in Georgia may refer to:

- Ethnic minorities in Georgia (country)
- Ethnic minorities in Georgia (U.S. state)

== See also ==
- African Americans in Georgia (U.S. state)
