= Nationaal Onderduikmuseum =

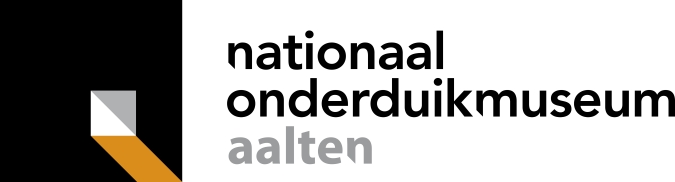
- Type: History
- Website: https://nationaalonderduikmuseum.nl/

The National Hiding Place Museum (formerly Markt 12 - Euregional Museum for Freedom) in Aalten, Netherlands is a museum dedicated to hiding places and the resistance. The museum highlights daily life during the Second World War and the personal choices people had to make at that time. The emphasis is on hiding during the occupation, partly because Aalten provided shelter to a relatively large number of people in hiding during the occupation. Adjacent rooms cover regional history.

== Mission ==
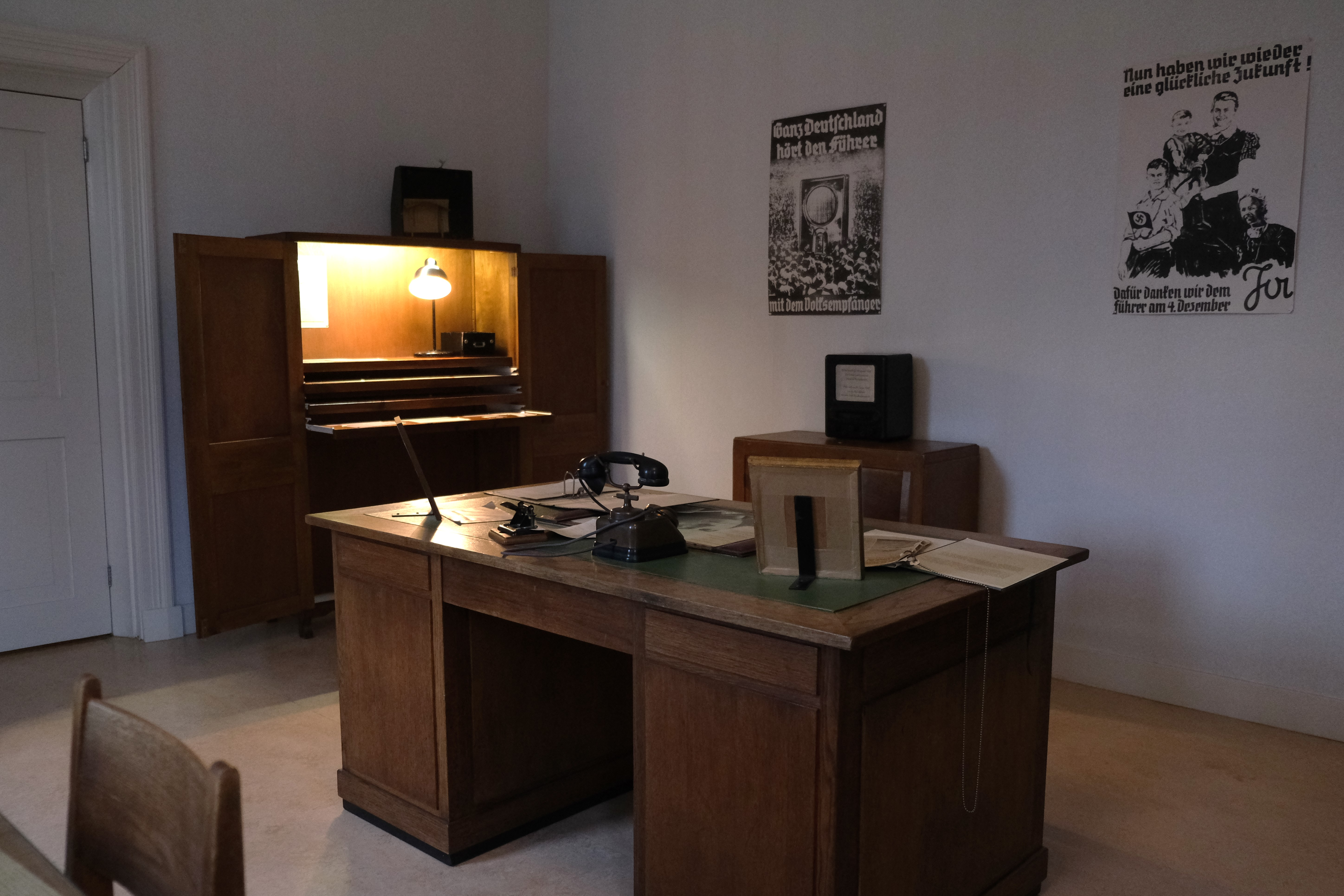
Office of the local commander

The National Hiding Museum aims to encourage visitors, young and old, to reflect and contemplate on phenomena such as racism, fascism and discrimination in the past, present and possibly also in the future. Partly because of its location on the border, the museum aims to promote Euregional contacts between Germans and Dutch people by learning about each other's history during the 1940s, on which countless prejudices are rooted. For this reason, the museum encourages meetings between German and Dutch schoolchildren through bilingual presentations and bilingual teaching materials.

The collection consists of an illegal printing press, hiding place, shelter, weapons, personal documents, uniforms, propaganda material, documents, photographs and other objects that give an impression of daily life and the (often difficult) choices people had to make at that time. Recording testimonies and telling personal stories is central to the collection.

Temporary exhibitions tie in with the museum's themes. Treasure hunts are available for children. In addition to teaching packages for schoolchildren, there are routes and guided tours available by appointment.

== Accommodation ==
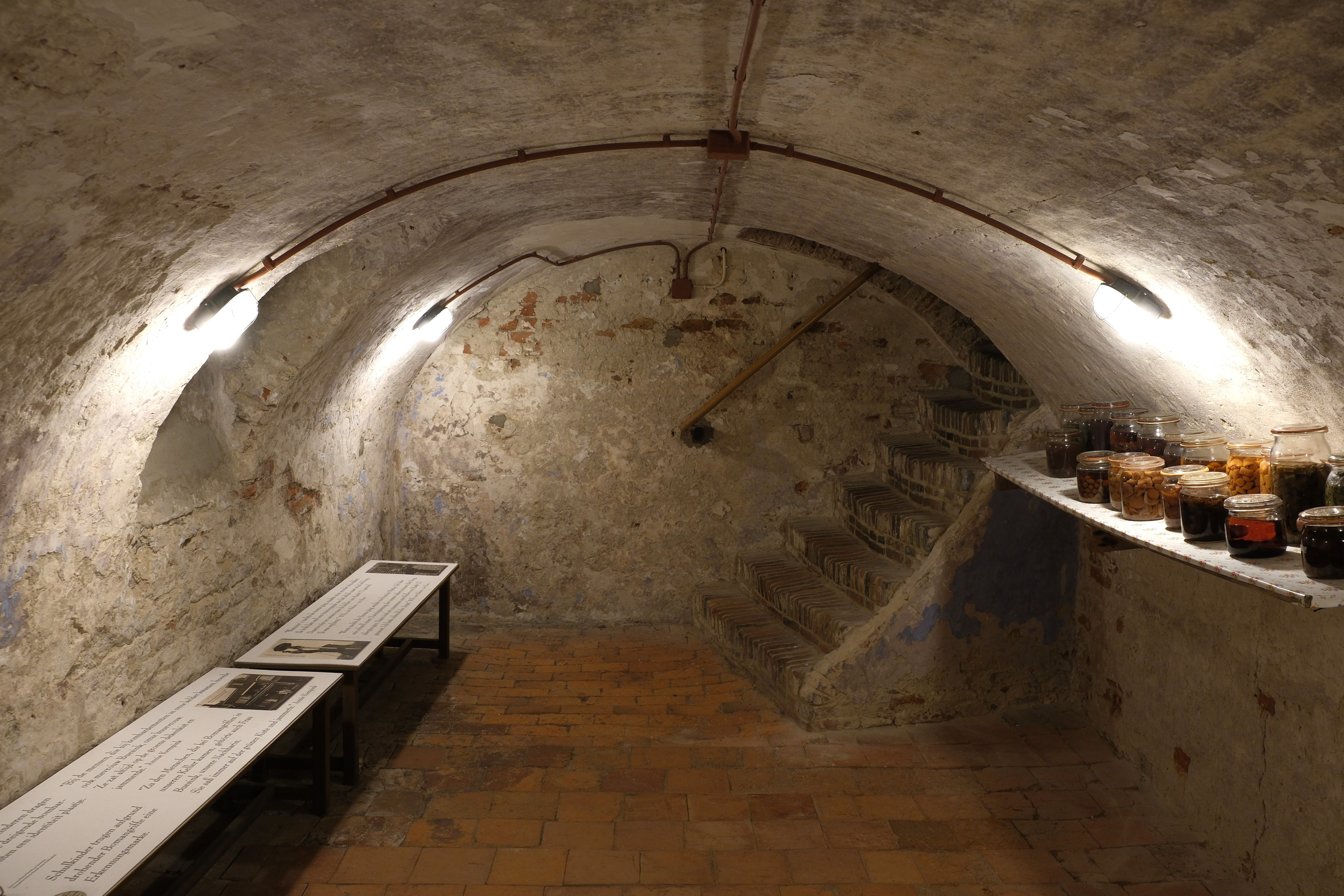
Refuge shelter

The original name of the museum, Markt 12, refers to the address of the building in which it is located, a former residence and national monument. The building has been restored to its condition during the Second World War.

During the occupation, the house was occupied by the Kempink family, who had two young children. The attic still contains the hiding place where eight people were concealed. Due to its central location in the village, the German Ortskommandant had established his office in the front room of the same house. The vaulted cellar served as a shelter for the entire neighbourhood during bombings.

== Inception ==
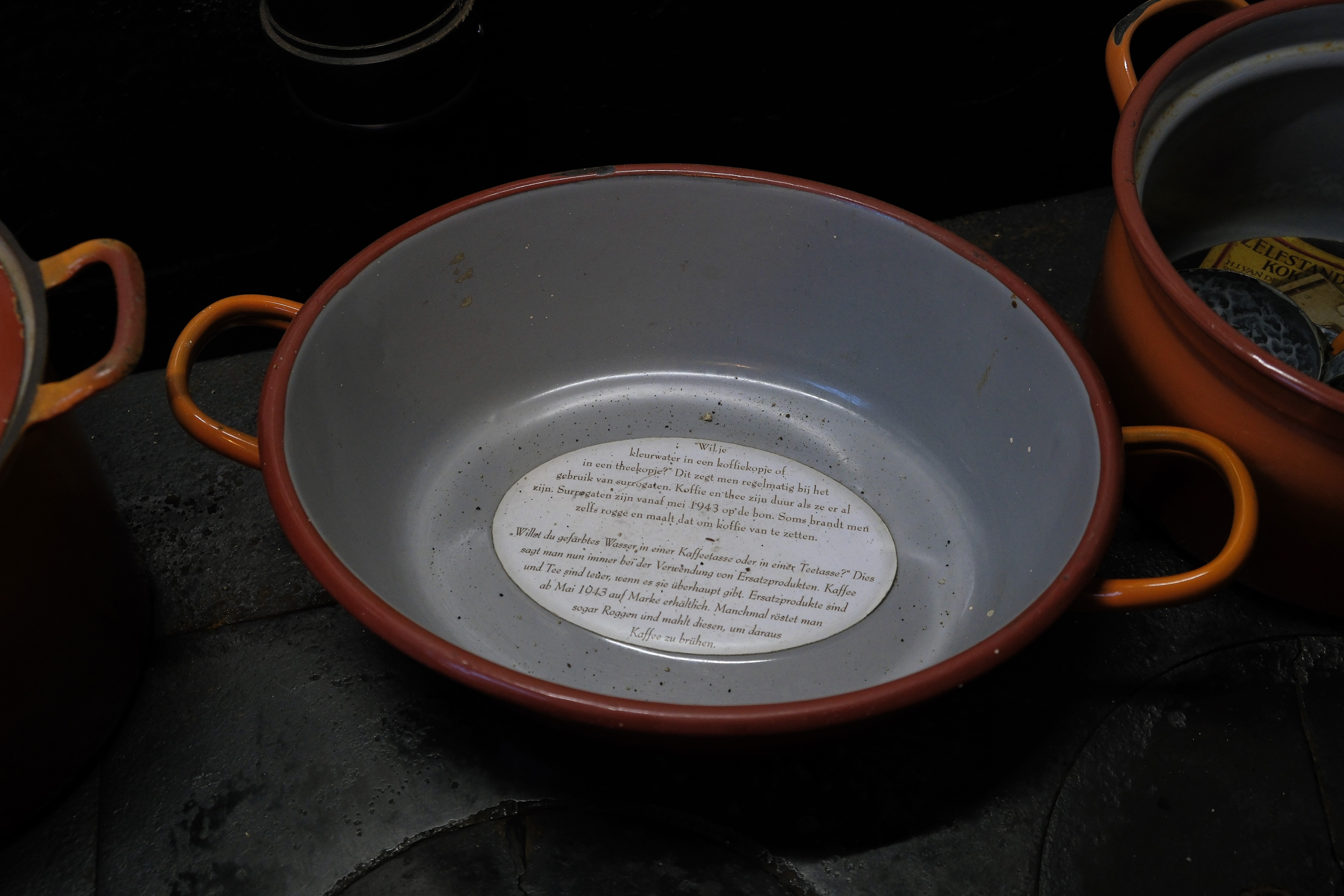
Information in a bowl

At the end of the 1990s, there were already plans in Aalten to purchase the building next to the Frerikshuus museum from the Kempink family, with the aim of establishing a museum about resistance and hiding in the Achterhoek region. In 2001, the Enschede-Gronau Euroregio approved the project application for the Interreg IIIA project “Xenophobia/racism – past and future”.

Over a period of four years, we collaborated with more than 40 institutes, partnerships, organisations and companies. The Education Market 12 project group included representatives from the education sector, namely the School Authority for the District of Borken, the Office for Culture and Public Relations, District of Borken, the Regional Association of Westphalia-Lippe in Münster, the Adult Education Centre in Borken, and secondary and primary schools in the Achterhoek region. The Lernwerkstatt in Bocholt was also involved in the collaboration.

The concept and implementation were developed in collaboration with Bureau Marcelwoutersontwerpers in Eindhoven (interactive design), Frappant Aalten (website and graphic design), the Gelders Erfgoed Foundation in Zutphen and the Anne Frank Foundation in Amsterdam. Further collaboration took place with the Anne Frank Zentrum in Berlin, the Ministry of Health, Welfare and Sport, and the Netherlands Institute for War Documentation (NIOD) in Amsterdam. Locally, ties were forged with the synagogues in Aalten and Winterswijk and the Friends of Kolle Kaal Foundation.

The opening, by the District President of Münster and the Queen's Commissioner in Gelderland, took place on 3 December 2004. Over 300 guests from Germany and the Netherlands were present.

== Organisation ==
The National Hiding Place Museum falls under the administrative authority of the Aalten Museums Association. It is a non-profit organisation with cultural tax reduction status. The administrative process is managed by a board consisting of members who perform this function on a voluntary basis. The museum's board delegates a large part of its tasks to the director. However, the board remains fully responsible and performs a supervisory function. The director is employed on a part-time basis. The association employs two part-time staff for cleaning/administration/secretarial work. In addition, one employee is hired through a WSW institution. Most of the work is carried out by approximately 130 unpaid volunteers.

== Escape room ==
On 12 May 2017, an escape room was opened in the museum. In this escape room, participants can experience what it is like to have to rely on each other in a predicament. Once the escape room is locked, the aim is to free oneself from the predicament within an hour by solving various dilemmas, puzzles and secret codes.

The idea for the Aalten escape room arose from a request by the National Hiding Museum to theatre makers Theo Soontiëns and Caro Wicher to explore the possibility of making the situation of people in hiding and refugees tangible and understandable, particularly for young people.

== Gallery ==
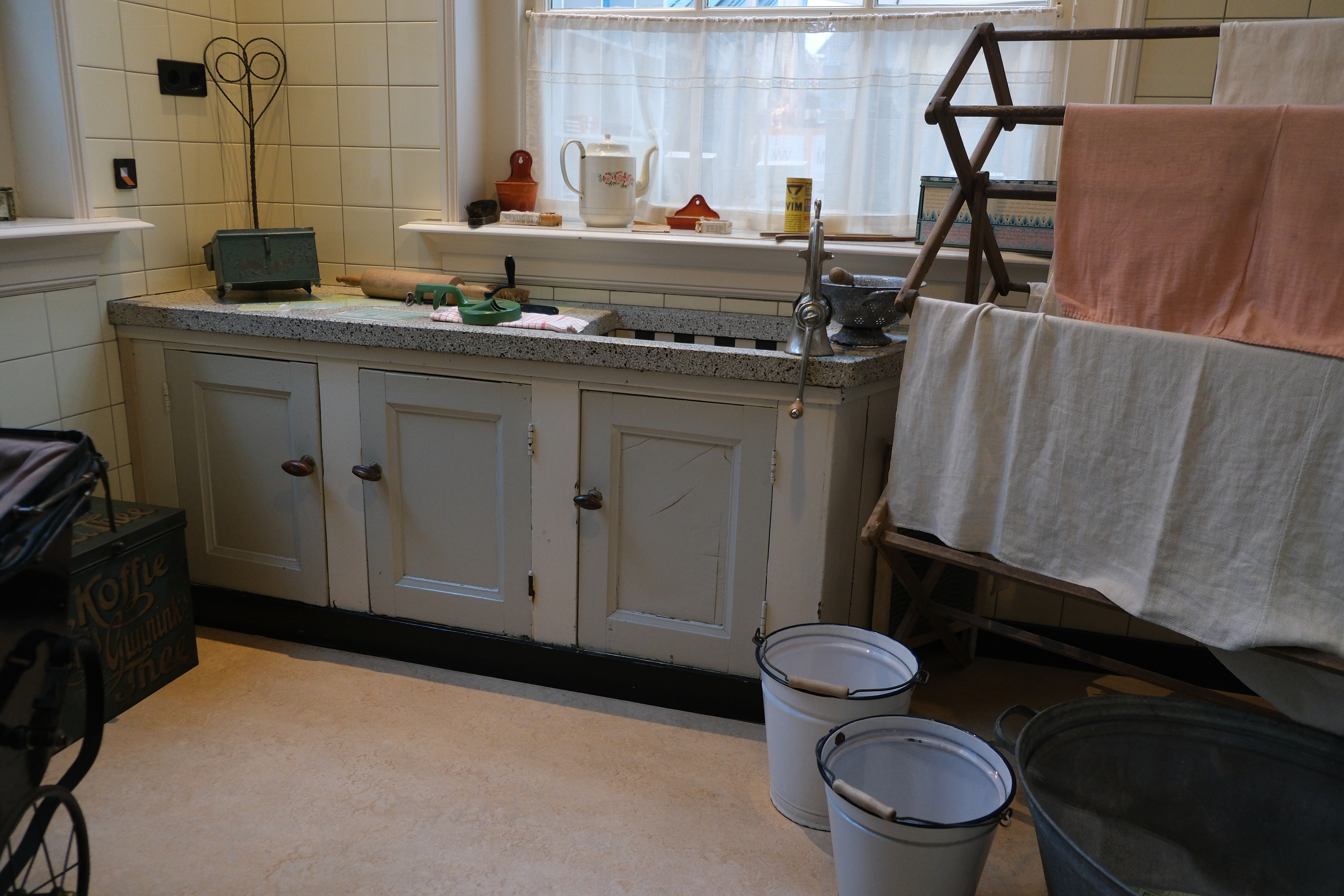
A contemporary kitchen

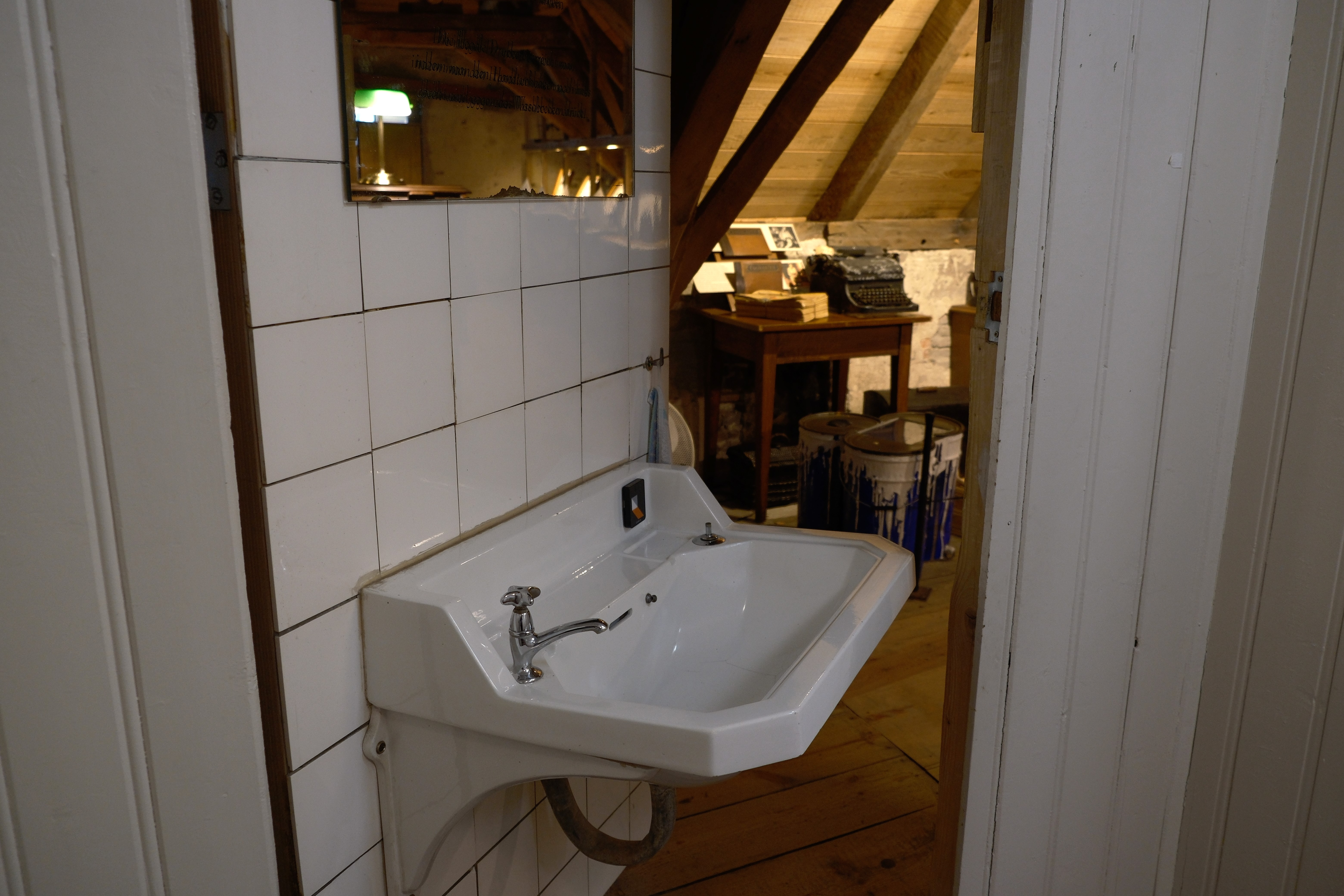
Hidden room

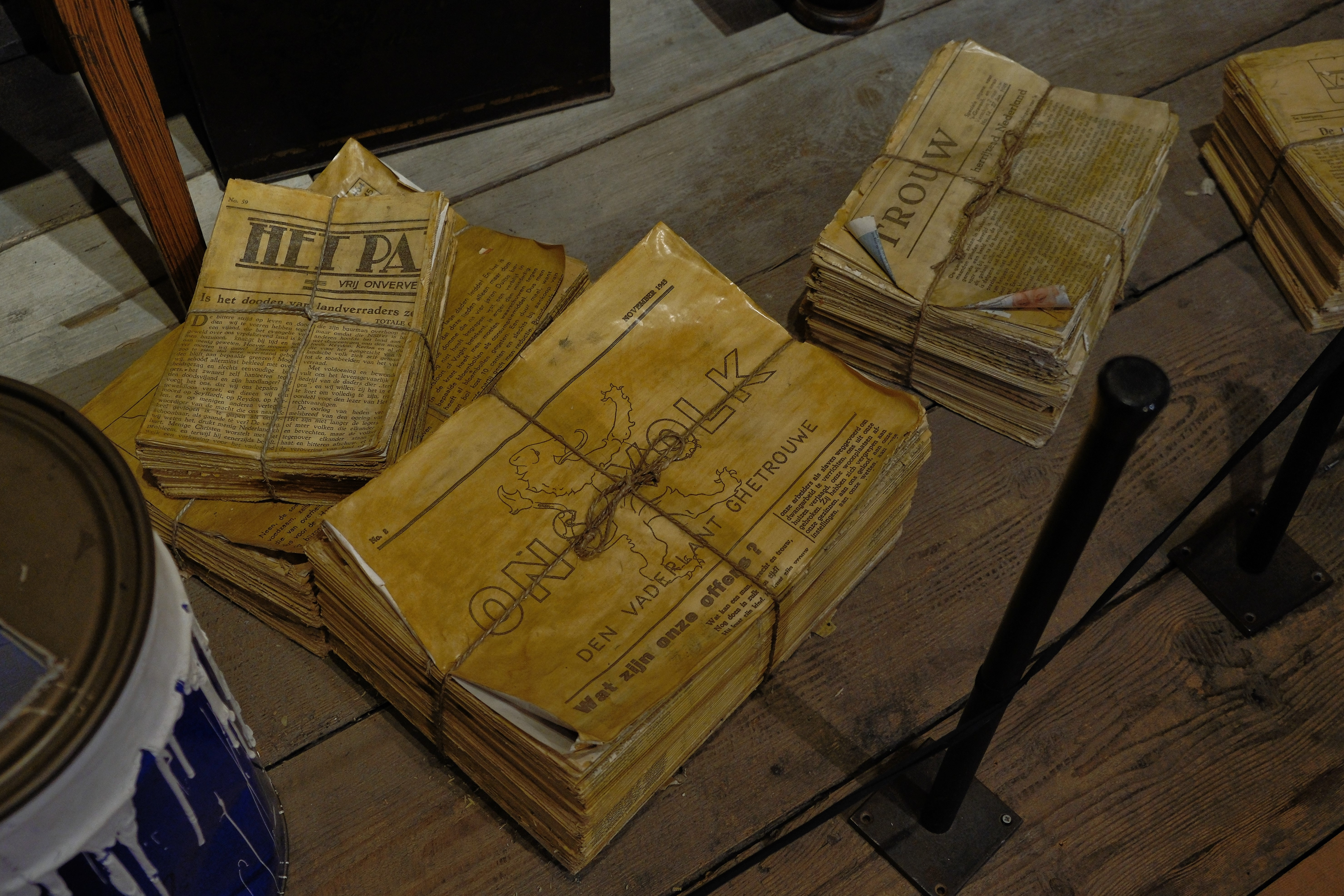
Illegal newspapers

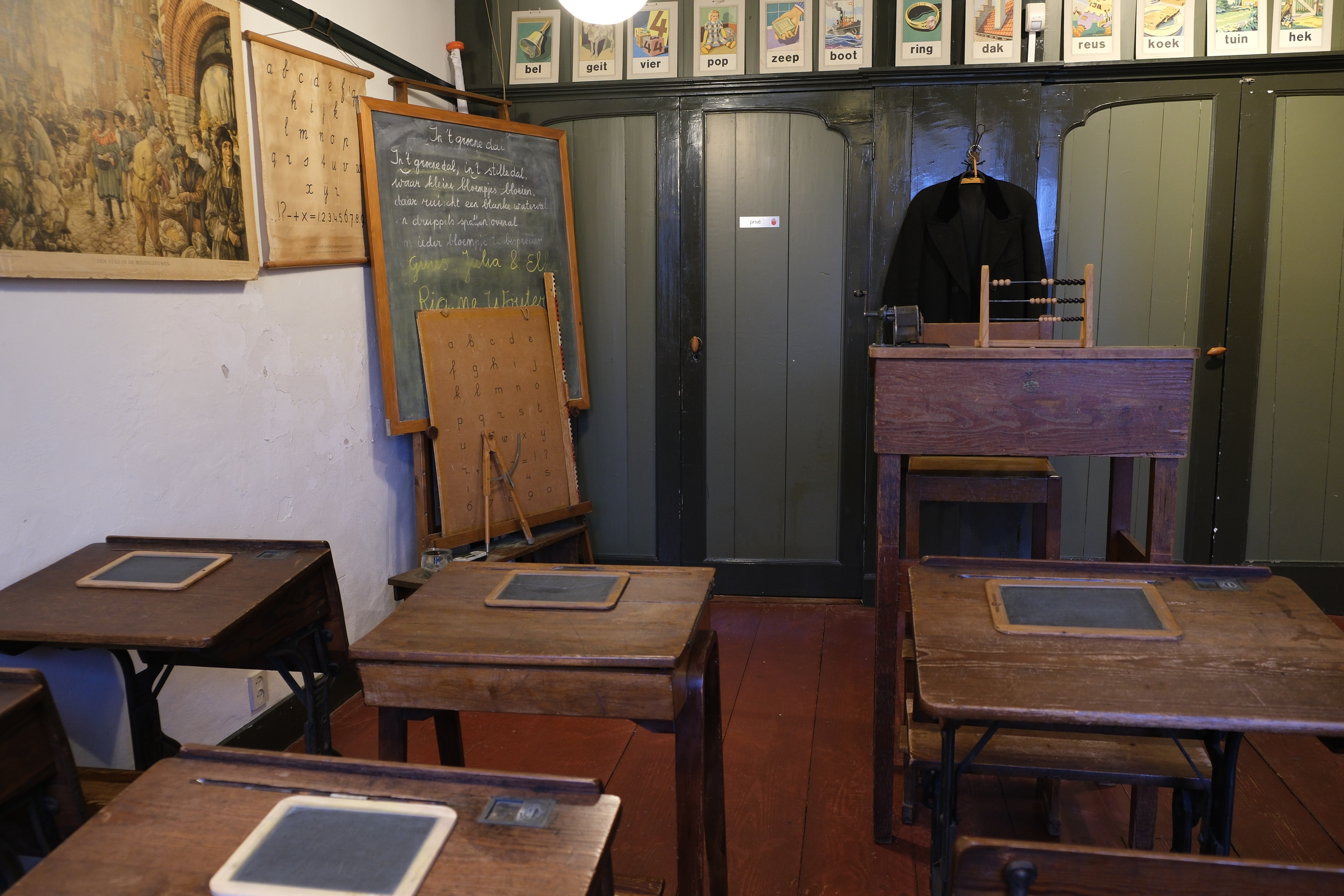
School room

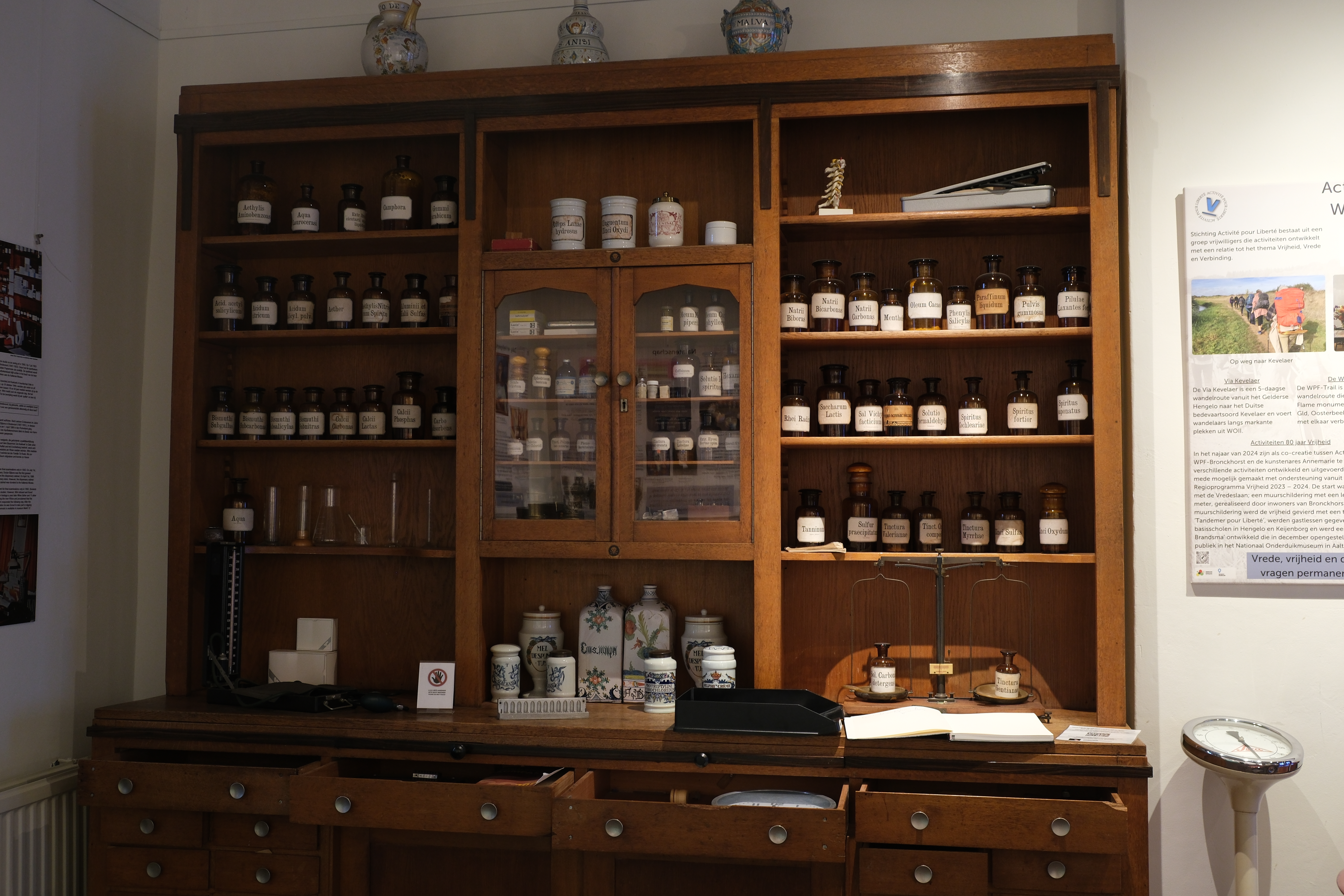
Former pharmacy

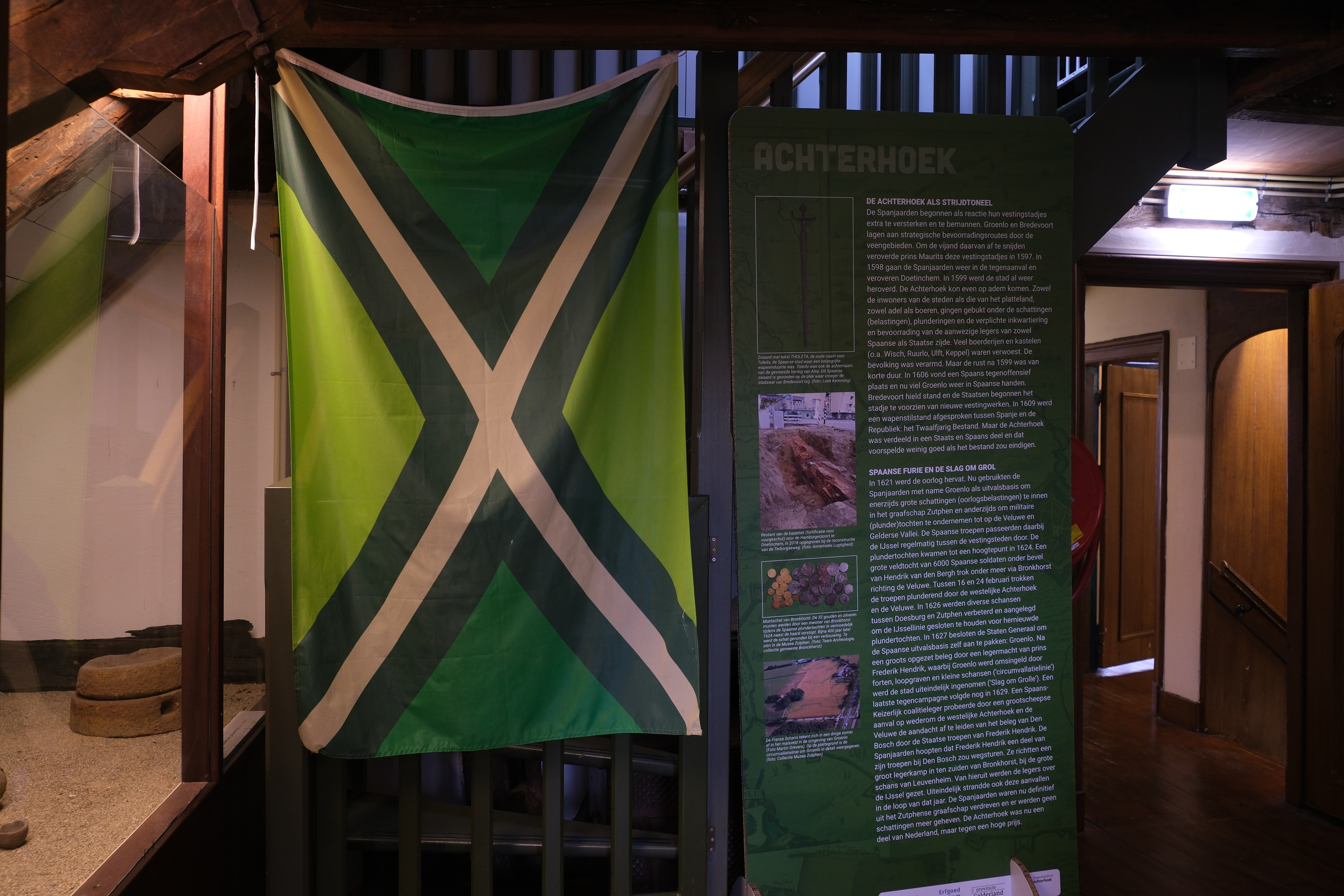
Exposition regional history

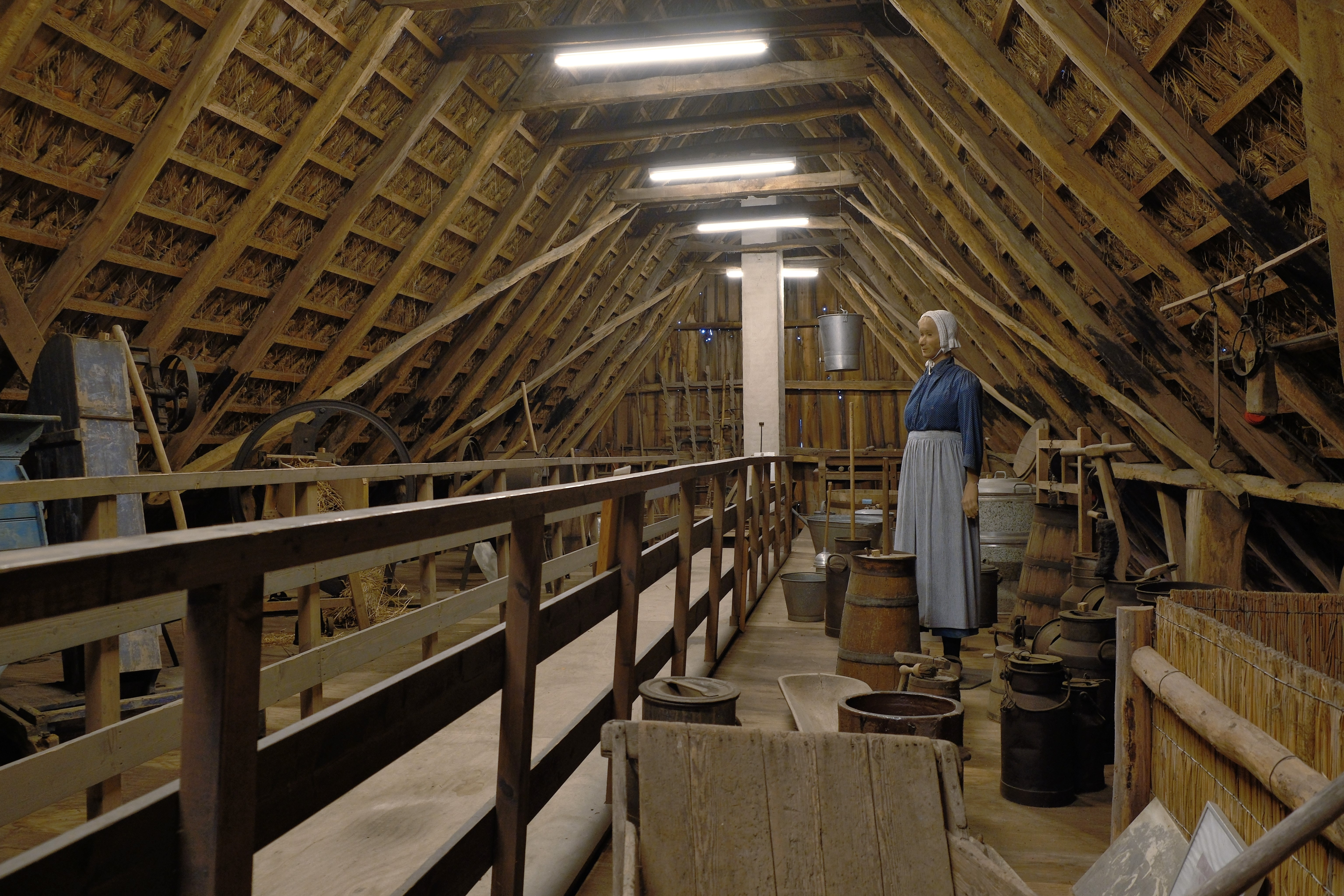
Shed
