= Ethnic minorities in Georgia (country) =

The main ethnic minorities in Georgia are Azerbaijanis, Armenians, Ukrainians, Russians, Greeks, Abkhazians, Ossetians, Kists, Assyrians and Yazidi.

There is also a small Jewish community.

Georgia is the only country in the region, along with Turkey, to have Roma, Dom and Lom communities living there.

== Ethnic minorities ==
According to the "National Integration and Tolerance in Georgia Assessment Survey Report" 2007–2008, implemented by the UN Association of Georgia and supported by USAID, the following ethnic groups are living in Georgia:

Ethnic groups	Total population
Total	4,371,535
Georgians	3,661,173
Azerbaijanis	284,761
Armenians	248,929
Russians	67,671
Ossetians	~60,000
Yazidis	18,329
Greeks	15,166
Kists	7,110
Ukrainians	7,039
Abkhazians	125,567
Assyrians	4,000

== Historical background ==
Georgia's ethnic composition varied from one historical epoch to another and this happened as the result of certain economic, political or social factors. Georgian academic Vakhtang Jaoshvili identified four major stages in the history of Georgia that influenced the ethnic composition of Georgia: from medieval times to the late 18th century; from the 19th century to the 1921 Soviet invasion of Georgia; from 1921 to the collapse of the USSR; and present days, starting with the Georgian declaration of independence.

As Georgia during medieval times remained the victim of military aggression coming from its neighbors, its territories near the borders were often abandoned by Georgians, and the vacated areas were occupied by other ethnic groups. In the 15th century Muslim populations moved to the Kvemo Kartli province. In this era, Ossetians also moved from Northern Caucasus, settling in Georgia. By the early 19th century Georgians made up only four-fifths of the total population.

In the beginning of the 19th century Georgia saw big influx of foreign populations which were deliberately settled in Georgia. In 1832 Georgians were 75.9 percent of total population in comparison to the 79,4 percent in 1800. This policy was started by the Russian Empire after establishing its rule over Georgia, replacing the Georgians populations near the borders with other ethnic groups because of economical or military interests. In the beginning of the 19th century Russia forced Muslim Georgians to move from Samtskhe-Javakheti to the Ottoman Empire, replacing them with Armenians who were encouraged by Russia to leave Iran and Turkey through the 1828 Treaty of Turkmenchay and the 1829 Treaty of Adrianople as signed respectively with the two. In 1830 the number of Armenian settlers reached 35,000. By 1830 18 Greek settlements appeared in Georgia as well. In addition Georgia also remained a potential place of residence for Russian demoralized soldiers and religious sects like Dukhobors. During World War I Kurds and Assyrians also settled in Georgia.

Under Soviet rule Georgia initially received a massive influx of immigrants, especially Ukrainians, Russians, Ossetians and Armenians. In addition, the increase of the birth rate among Jews, Azerbaijanis or other ethnic groups led to a significant decrease in ethnic Georgians and by 1939, for the first time in the history of Georgia, Georgians were less than two-thirds of the whole population. After the World War II, the immigration decreased, and starting from 1957, the number of non-Georgian emigrants increased in comparison to the number of immigrants. By 1979 the share of Georgians was 62.1 percent in urban areas and 75.7 percent in rural areas.

These tendencies continued after collapse of the Soviet Union, with emigration from Georgia, especially from war zones in Abkhazia and South Ossetia. Thus, ethnic minorities in 1989 constituted 30 percent of total population, and by 2002 this number had dropped to 16 percent.

== Rule of law ==
As a member of the international community Georgia has ratified several international agreements providing guarantees for ethnic minorities living on the territory of Georgia. Following is a list of such agreements, followed by the date of ratification by Georgia:

- Universal Declaration of Human Rights (15.09.1991)
- International Covenant on Civil and Political Rights (25.01.1994)
- International Covenant on Economic, Social and Cultural Rights (25.01.1994)
- International Convention Concerning discrimination in respect of Employment and Occupation (04.05.1995)
- European Cultural Convention (16.04.1997)
- International Convention on the Elimination of All Forms of Racial Discrimination (16.04.1999)
- Convention for The Protection of Human Rights and Fundamental Freedoms (12.05.1999)
- European Charter of Local Self-Government (16.10.2004)
- Framework Convention for the Protection of National Minorities (13.10.2005)
- European Outline Convention on Trans-frontier Co-operation between Territorial Communities or Authorities (04.11.2006)

== Education ==
According to the Georgian Law on General Education every citizen of Georgia has a right on receiving secondary education in their native language if Georgian is not their native language. In addition it is also obligatory to teach state language in schools. As of 2008, the Georgian government funded:

- 141 Armenian-language schools.
- 117 Azerbaijani-language schools
- 151 Russian-language schools
- 3 Ossetian-language schools.
- 161 bilingual schools
- 6 trilingual schools

In order to provide equal opportunity for every citizen of Georgia to receive higher education, the students can choose to pass national examination in general skills in Russian, English, Azerbaijani, Armenian, Ossetian or Abkhaz language. After this, if they pass the general skills tests, the students go through the state-funded special training program in Georgian language, and continue their education in Georgian universities.

In 2005 the Zurab Zhvania School of Public Administration was founded with the assistance of President and State in order to implement and promote democratic values in regional governmental and self-governmental institutions, and to improve the quality of social services and civil service. The school focuses on the preparation of civil servants and on the promotion of the teaching of Georgian language to ethnic minorities.

== Media ==
The Georgian Public Broadcaster (GPB) has special new programmes in Abkhaz, Azerbaijani, Armenian, Russian and Ossetian languages. In addition, there is special public broadcasting in the Abkhaz and Ossetian languages focused on Abkhazia and South Ossetia regions.

== Sources ==
- Komakhia, Mamuka (2008). "Georgia's Ethnic History and the Present Migration Processes". Central Asia and the Caucasus. 1 (49).
