= Cross-border region =

Territorial entity belonging to multiple nations

A cross-border region is a territorial entity that is made of several local or regional authorities that are co-located yet belong to different nation states. Cross-border regions exist to take advantage of geographical conditions to strengthen their competitiveness.

== Cross-border regions in Europe ==
In Europe, there are a large number of cross-border regions. Some of them are often referred to as 'Euroregions' although this is an imprecise concept that is used for a number of different arrangements. European cross-border regions are most commonly constituted through co-operation among border municipalities, districts or regions.

Many cross-border regions receive financial support from the European Commission via its Interreg programme. They vary in their legal and administrative set-up but have in common that they are not 'regions' in an administrative-constitutional sense. Many cross-border regions are based on some sort of civil-law agreements among the participating authorities. For instance, the classical form of a Euroregion is the ‘twin association’: On each side of the border, municipalities and districts form an association according to a legal form suitable within their own national legal systems. In a second step, the associations then join each other on the basis of a civil-law cross-border agreement to establish the cross-border entity. Many Euroregions along the Germany–Benelux border are established according to this model, following the initiatives by the EUREGIO.

== History ==
The first European cross-border region, the EUREGIO, was established in 1958 on the Dutch–German border, in the area of Enschede (NL) and Gronau (DE). Since then, Euroregions and other forms of cross-border co-operation have developed throughout Europe.

For local and regional authorities, engaging in cross-border regions meant they entered a field long reserved for central state actors. For dealing with issues such as local cross-border spatial planning or transport policy, in the 1960s and 1970s various bi-lateral and multi-lateral governmental commissions were established without granting access to local authorities (Aykaç 1994). They dealt with issues such as local cross-border spatial planning and transport policy.

But over the last 30 years, the scope for non-central governments (NCGs) to co-operate across borders has widened considerably. To a large degree, this can be related to macro-regional integration in Europe. In particular, two supranational bodies, the Council of Europe and the European Union, were important for improving the conditions under which NCGs could co-operate across borders. Whereas the Council of Europe was in past particularly active in improving the legal situation, the Commission of the European Union new provides substantial financial support for CBC initiatives.

Legally, the first cross-border regions were based on agreements with varying degrees of formality and mostly relied on good will. In 1980, on the initiative of the Council of Europe, the so-called Madrid Convention (Outline Convention on Transfrontier Co-operation) was introduced as a first step towards CBC structures based on public law. The convention has been signed by 20 countries and was more recently updated with two Additional Protocols. It provides a legal framework for completing bi- and multinational agreements for public law CBC among NCGs. Examples for such agreements are the Benelux Convention on Cross-border Relations of 1989 and the German-Dutch Treaty of Anholt of 1991. The Rhine-Waal Euroregion on the Dutch–German border has been such a cross-national public body since 1993. However, the regulations delivered by such agencies are binding only on the public authorities within the cross-border area concerned and not on civil subjects (Denters et al. 1998).

Compared with the Council of Europe, the CBC-related activities of the EU are primarily financial. Many CBC initiatives are eligible for support under the Interreg community initiative launched by the European Commission in 1990; this policy was re-confirmed as Interreg II in 1994 and as Interreg III in 1999.

== Types of European cross-border regions ==
There are several ways in which cross-border regions can be distinguished. First, they vary in geographic scope. Small-scale initiatives such as the EUREGIO can be distinguished from larger groupings, such as the 'Working Communities'. The latter – most of them were founded between 1975 and 1985 – usually comprise several regions forming large areas that can stretch over several nation states. Examples of Working Communities are the Arge Alp, the Alpes-Adria, the Working Community of the Western Alps (COTRAO), the Working Community of the Pyrenees or the Atlantic Arc. Their organizational structures usually consist of a general assembly, an executive committee, thematic working groups and secretariats (Aykaç, 1994: 12–14), but activities tend to be confined to common declarations and information exchange. However, some groupings, such as the Atlantic Arc, succeeded in obtaining European funds (Balme et al., 1996).

Smaller initiatives are technically referred to as micro cross-border regions but for simplicity they can be called Euroregions. Euroregions have a long tradition in certain areas of post-war Europe, especially on the Germany–Benelux border, where the expressions Euroregion and Euregio were coined. Organizationally, Euroregions usually have a council, a presidency, subject-matter oriented working groups and a common secretariat. The term Euroregion can refer both to a territorial unit, comprising the territories of the participating authorities, and an organizational entity, usually the secretariat or management unit.

Legally, the cooperation can take different forms, ranging from legally non-binding arrangements to public-law bodies. The spatial extension of micro-CBRs will usually range between 50 and 100 km in width; and they tend to be inhabited by a few million inhabitants. In most cases, the participating authorities are local authorities, although in other cases regional or district authorities are involved. Occasionally, third organizations, such as regional development agencies, interest associations and chambers of commerce, have become official members. The organizational set-up can also differ from the original model inspired by the Dutch–German EUREGIO.

Cross-border regions also differ in terms of how closely the participating parties work with each other. While some initiatives hardly go beyond ceremonial contacts, others are engaged in enduring and effective collaboration. For estimating the co-operation intensity of existing CBC arrangements, a catalogue of criteria proposed by the AEBR can be used:

- co-operation based on some type of legal arrangement, common permanent secretariat controlling its own resources
- existence of an explicitly documented development strategy
- broad scope of co-operation in multiple policy areas, similar to conventional local or regional authorities

A third way of distinguishing cross-border regions considers the nature of the participating authorities. Most of the small-scale initiatives involve local authorities as the driving protagonists whereas large-scale CBC is almost exclusively driven by regional authorities. There is variance in this respect, depending on the territorial organization of different European countries. For instance, in Germany, local administration comprises two levels, the municipalities and the Kreise, with the latter being self-governed groupings of municipalities. In most cases, the Kreise are the driving force behind cross-border initiatives. By contrast, in Italy, it is meso-level authorities, the 'province' (provinces), that are usually involved in cross-border cooperation initiatives while the municipalities play a minor role because of their relative fragmentation compared to the German Kreise. In Scandinavia, as for instance in the Øresund region, both counties and large urban municipalities (Greater Copenhagen) participate in the cooperation arrangement. In general, in countries with a strong role for inter-municipal associations, cross-border co-operation is often pursued by local actors. By contrast, in countries with a two-tier regional administration and a minor role for inter-local action (such as Italy or France), cross-border regions are a domain pursued by regional authorities.
