= Outline Convention on Transfrontier Co-operation =

1980 treaty

European Outline Convention on Transfrontier Co-operation between Territorial Communities or Authorities
- Parties Signatories
- Signed: 21 May 1980
- Location: Madrid, Spain
- Effective: 22 December 1981
- Condition: Ratification by 4 States
- Signatories: 40
- Parties: 39
- Depositary: Secretary General of the Council of Europe
- Languages: English and French

The European Outline Convention on Transfrontier Co-operation between Territorial Communities or Authorities, also called the Madrid Convention, was launched by the Council of Europe (CoE) in 1980. The convention provides a legal framework for the establishment of cross-border regions. As of 2014, it has been ratified by 39 CoE member states.

The convention has two parts. Whereas the first part contains the legally binding regulations of the treaties, the second part lists a series of ‘model agreements’, both for the inter-state and the local levels, as options for possible CBC arrangements. This latter part of the convention is intended for guidance only and has no treaty value.
The legally binding obligation the Convention puts on the signatory states is to facilitate cross-border cooperation between territorial authorities and to promote the conclusion of agreements that may prove necessary for this purpose (art. 1). Furthermore, the contracting parties commit to encourage any initiative by territorial authorities inspired by the model agreements listed in part two of the convention. At the same time, the fulfilment of these obligations is subject to a number of clauses. CBC shall not alter the existing powers of the territorial authorities as they are defined in the respective domestic legal orders. The signatory states are also allowed to exclude certain types of authorities from the scope of the convention. These clauses mean that the fulfilment of the international law Convention is always limited by national law.
The second part of the Convention contains various optional ‘model agreements’, grouped in two categories, i.e. inter-state agreements on the one hand, and contracts between local authorities, on the other. The proposed model agreements provide possible frameworks for varying degrees of co-operation which were drafted according to actually existing CBC treaties and arrangements, such as the 1974 treaty between Luxembourg and the German Land Rheinland-Pfalz. For instance, the model agreements listed under art. 1.4 and 1.5 were inspired by the such as the 1974 treaty between Luxembourg and the German Land Rheinland-Pfalz Subsequently, they informed a series of further inter-state treaties, enabling local authorities to participate in private and public law CBC initiatives.

In 1995, the convention was supplemented by an Additional Protocol , ruling that cross-border co-operative arrangements can be set up as independent bodies which may or may not have legal personality. If the co-operation body does have legal personality, the latter is defined in the law of the country in which its headquarters are located. As stated in art. 4, the co-operation body cannot be empowered to take measures which apply generally or which might affect the rights and freedoms of individuals. It must be specified whether the body is to be considered a public or private law entity within the respective national legal systems.
However, the protocol gives the signatory states the option to extend the powers of such co-operation bodies (art. 5). They can be established as public law entities whose decisions have the same legal force as if they had been taken by the participating authorities themselves. Such bodies can therefore make decisions which are legally binding not only for the participating authorities but also for any individuals affected. In view of the far-reaching implications of such a transnational public authority, Germany, France and Sweden chose to sign the protocol without art. 5.
The Additional Protocol significantly extends the provisions made by the Madrid Convention. However, the Convention still does not contain any regulations that override national law. This is why all initiatives have to conform to the national legal systems of the respective countries. Thus, no public law CBC initiative can be based on the CoE Convention and its additional protocols, but must be grounded either in inter-state treaties or at least unilaterally in national law.
