= Euregio Meuse-Rhine =

Region of Belgium, Germany and Netherlands

- Map of the Meuse-Rhine Euregion showing the Region of Aachen (red); the southern part of Dutch Limburg (blue); Belgian Limburg (light green); Liège Province (mid-green); and the German-speaking Community of Belgium (dark green).
- Administrative seat: Eupen, Belgium
- Type: Euroregion
- Membership: Aachen; Liège Province; Belgian Limburg; Southern Dutch Limburg
- Establishment: 1976

Area
  - Total: 11,000 km^{2} (4,200 sq mi)

Population
  - Estimate: 3,900,000

The Euregio Meuse-Rhine (Dutch: Euregio Maas–Rijn [øːˈreːɣijoː ˌmaːsˈrɛin], French: Eurorégion Meuse–Rhin [øʁɔʁeʒjɔ̃ møz ʁɛ̃], German: Euregio Maas–Rhein [ɔʏˈʁeːɡi̯o ˌmaːsˈʁaɪn], Limburgish: Euregio Maas–Rien [øːˈʀeːɣijoː ˌmaːsˈʀiːn]) is a Euroregion created in 1976, with judicial status achieved in 1991. It comprises 11.000 km^{2} and has around 3.9 million inhabitants around the city-corridor of Aachen–Maastricht–Hasselt–Liège. The seat of the region has been in Eupen, Belgium since 1 January 2007. Within a wider context, the region is part of what is called the Blue Banana European urbanisation corridor.

== Governmental areas ==
The Euregio Meuse-Rhine comprises:

- The western part of the governmental Region of Cologne in Germany including the city of Aachen, the District of Aachen, the District of Düren, the District of Euskirchen and the District of Heinsberg, collectively referred to as the Region of Aachen.
- The German-speaking Community of Belgium; the seat of the Euregio is located in its capital Eupen.
- The Belgian Liège Province.
- The Belgian Limburg Province.
- The southern part of the Dutch Province of Limburg, with the northern point of the Euregio Meuse-Rhine being the city of Roermond. The Euregio Meuse-Rhine includes the provincial capital city of Maastricht as well as the co-operative region Parkstad Limburg surrounding the city of Heerlen.

Though they do not officially comprise the core of the Euroregion, the following areas are often associated with it through inter-regional agreements:

- The Bitburg-Prüm and Vulkaneifel districts in Rhineland-Palatinate, Germany.
- The eastern half of the Flemish Brabant region in Flanders, Belgium.
- Parts of the Hainaut Region of Wallonia, Belgium.
- The central part of Province of Limburg
- Much of the North Brabant region, which includes the city of Eindhoven.

== Languages ==
The official languages of the three countries involved in the Euregion are Dutch (in Belgium and the Netherlands), French (in Belgium) and German (in Belgium and Germany). Regional languages are also spoken namely Limburgish (which is recognised as a regional language in Dutch Limburg), Ripuarian and Walloon. The intra-cultural aspect of the Limburgish and Ripuarian is that they are spoken on both sides of the border. Limburgish, although only recognised as such in The Netherlands, is also spoken in Belgian Limburg and North Rhine-Westphalia. Ripuarian is also spoken on both sides of the Dutch–German border, but with the extra trait of having the same variant spoken on both sides of the border.

In daily life, one rarely makes a distinction between Limburgish and Ripuarian. The latter language hardly enjoys any recognition by people who speak it. The dialects of both linguistic groups change gradually from village to village, and the overlap from Limburgish dialects to Ripuarian dialects is hard to pin-point. Moreover, Ripuarian-speakers in Dutch Limburg generally consider their dialects to be part of the Limburgish language, not the Ripuarian one. On the other hand, Ripuarian-speakers on the German side of the border rarely use the term "Ripuarian" and generally refer to it as Plat(t), a term that is also used by Limburgish-speakers for their own mother-tongue.

== See also ==
- EUREGIO
- Ems Dollart Region
