= West Netherlands =

Coordinates: 52°22′22″N 4°53′37″E

West Netherlands West-Nederland
- Region
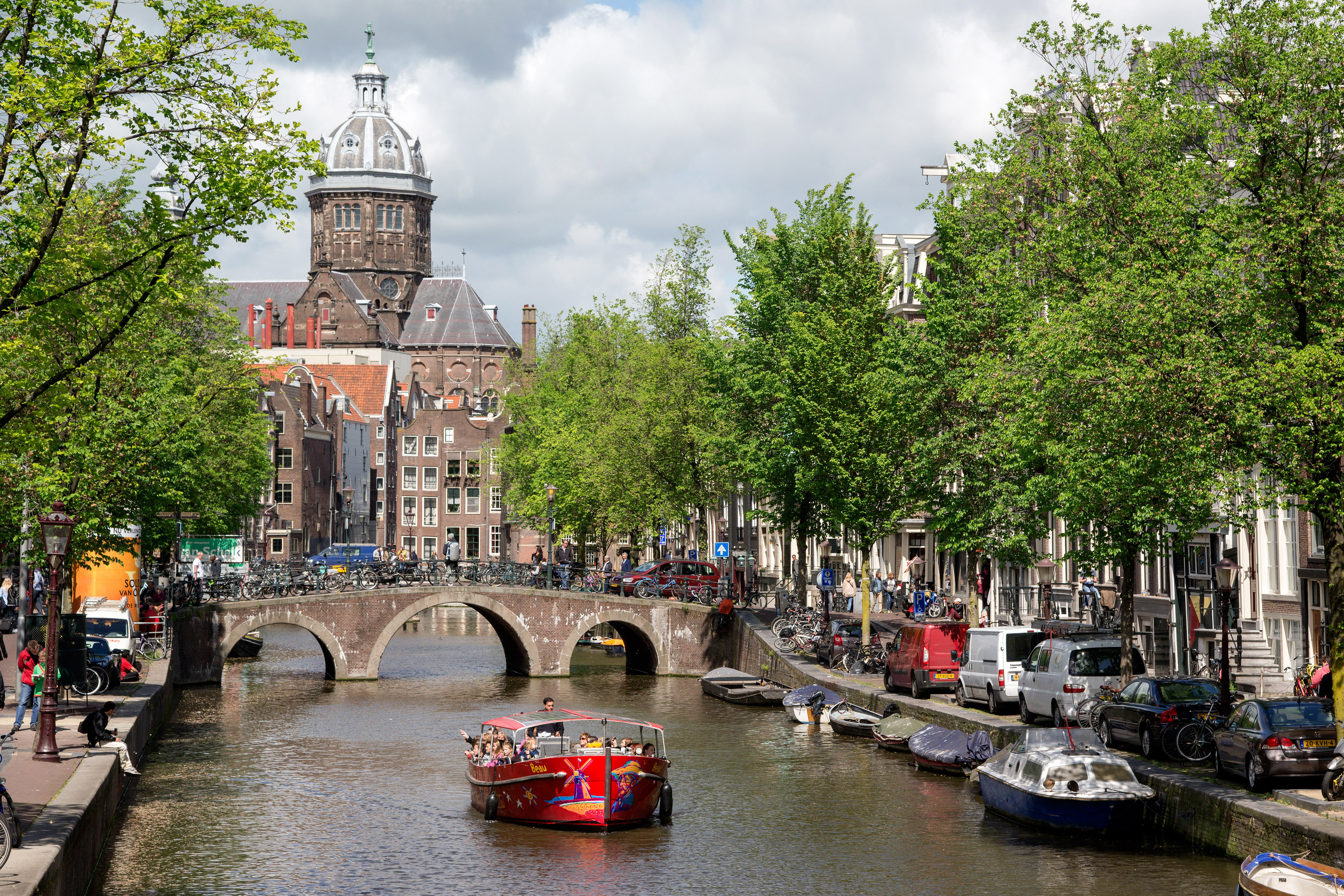
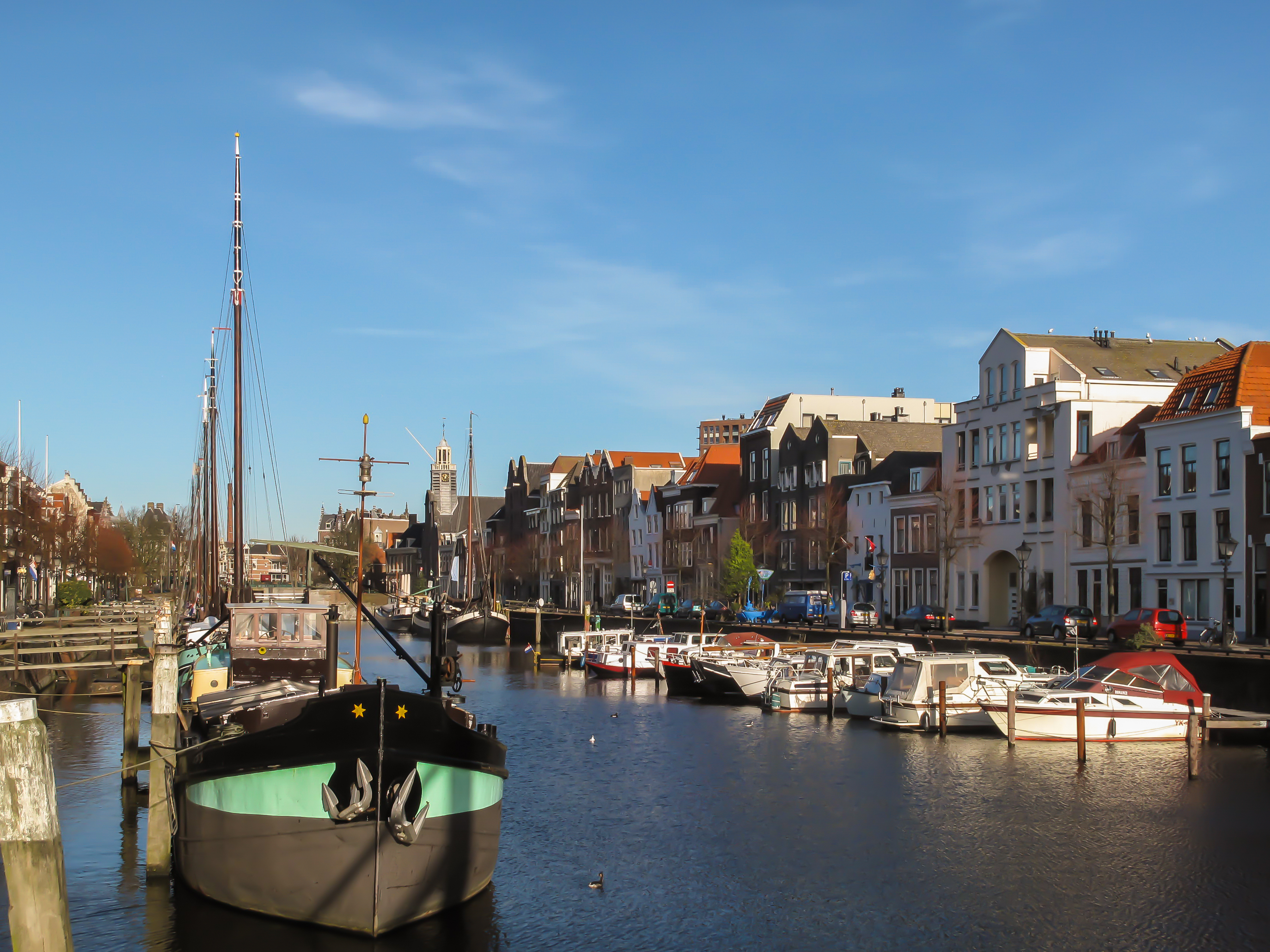
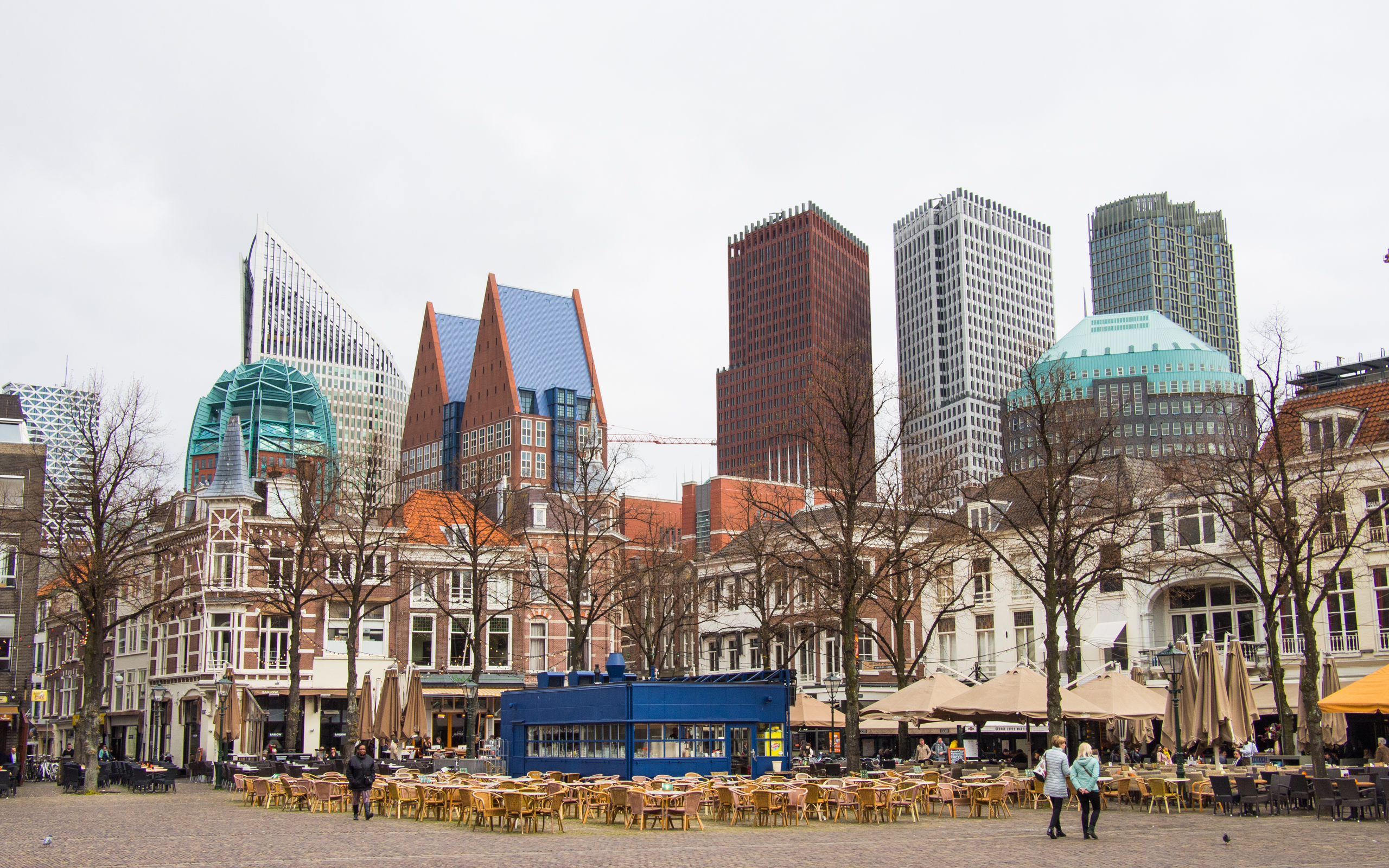
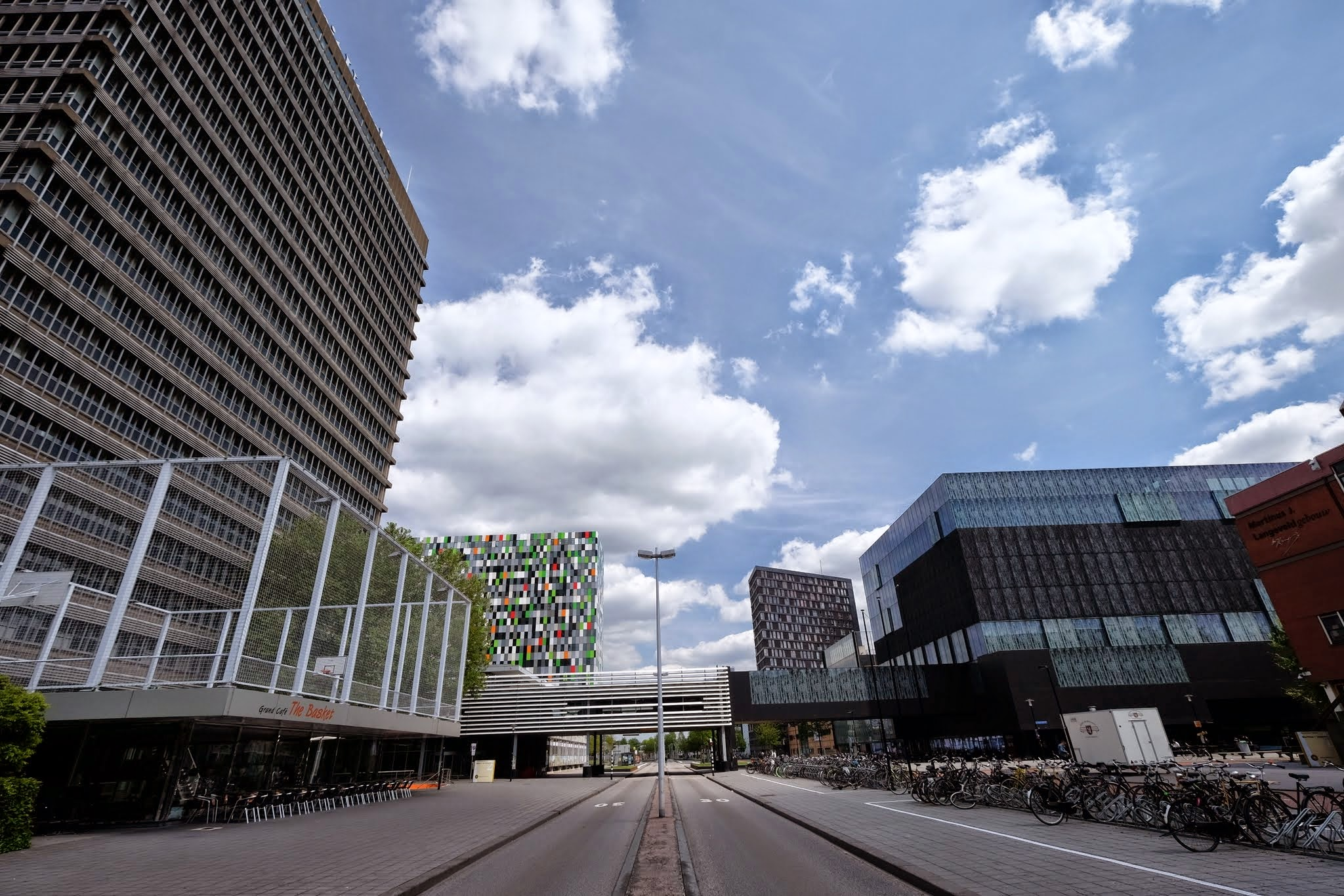
- Amsterdam Rotterdam The Hague Utrecht

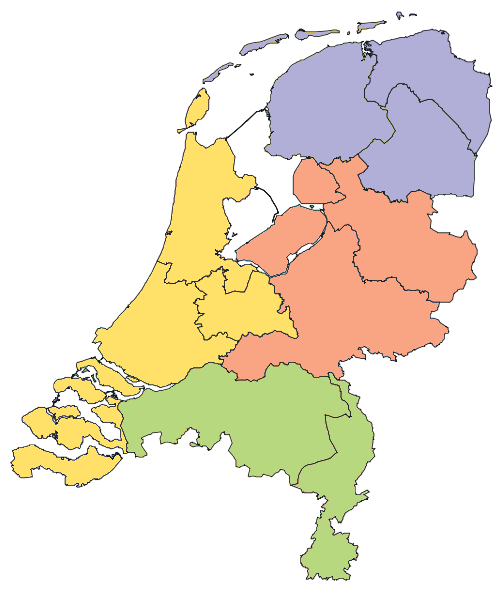
- West Netherlands in yellow
- Country: Netherlands

Area
  - Total: 11,892 km^{2} (4,592 sq mi)

Population (2024)
  - Total: 8,608,638
  - Density: 723.90/km^{2} (1,874.9/sq mi)

GDP
  - Total: €567.006 billion (2023)
- NUTS code: NL3
- HDI (2022): 0.950 very high

West Netherlands (Dutch: West-Nederland) is a subdivision of Netherlands as defined by the Nomenclature of Territorial Units for Statistics (NUTS). It is one of the four classified NUTS-1 statistical regions of Netherlands. The region incorporates the western parts of the country, and encompasses an area of 11,892 km^{2} (4,592 sq mi). The region has a long coastline along the North Sea to the west and shares an international border with Belgium to the south. It incorporates four provinces –North Holland, South Holland, Utrecht, and Zeeland. With a population of over 8.6 million, it is densely populated and is the most populated of the all the regions in Netherlands. The region forms most of the Randstad region, and includes the capital Amsterdam and the country's other largest urban areas in Rotterdam, The Hague, and Utrecht.

== Classification ==
The country of Netherlands is organized into 12 provinces for administrative purposes. The Nomenclature of Territorial Units for Statistics (NUTS) organizes the country into four broader level subdivisions. These are classified as a NUTS-1 statistical regions, and incorporate one or more provinces within it. The provinces form the NUTS-2 territorial units under them.

== Geography ==
West Netherlands incorporates the western parts of the country, encompassing an area of 11,892 km^{2} (4,592 sq mi). The region is located in Western Europe, and shares a coastline along the North Sea to the west. It shares an international land border with Belgium in the south. It is bordered by North Netherlands to the northeast, East Netherlands to the east, and South Netherlands to the southeast. Being closer to the sea, much of the region lies at a low altitude, and few regions lie below the mean sea level. The region forms most of the Randstad region, which is one of the most densely populated urban areas in Europe.

=== Sub-divisions ===
The region incorporates four provinces –North Holland, South Holland, Utrecht, and Zeeland. The provinces have remained the same since 1840 when North and South Holland was split from the Holland province.

Flag	Location	Province	Capital	Largest city	Municipalities	Total area		Land area		Water area		Population (2024)	GRDP mn Euros (2022)
Flag	Location	Province	Capital	Largest city	Municipalities	km^{2}	mi^{2}	km^{2}	mi^{2}	km^{2}	mi^{2}	Population (2024)	GRDP mn Euros (2022)
North Holland		North Holland	Haarlem (Note: Amsterdam is the national capital of the Netherlands. Haarlem is, however, the capital of the province in which both Amsterdam and Haarlem are situated.)	Amsterdam	44	4,092	1,580	2,663	1,028	1,429	552	2,976,487	231,562
South Holland		South Holland	The Hague (Note: The Dutch parliament and the seat of the Dutch government are located in The Hague along with the Supreme Court and the Council of State.)	Rotterdam	50	3,308	1,277	2,698	1,042	609	235	3,840,460	217,061
		Utrecht	Utrecht		26	1,560	602	1,484	573	76	29	1,400,057	99,348
Zeeland		Zeeland	Middelburg	Terneuzen	13	2,933	1,133	1,780	687	1,154	445	391,634	19,035

== Demographics ==
With a population of over 8.6 million, it is the most populated of the all the regions in Netherlands, and includes the capital Amsterdam and the country's other largest urban areas in Rotterdam, Hague, and Utrecht. With a Gross regional domestic product of over 567 billion Euros, the region contributes to more than 57% of the country's GDP.
