= Ems Dollart Region =

EDR Logo

The Ems Dollart Region (EDR), established in 1977, is a cross-border organisation located in the northern Dutch-German border area. The region is named after the Ems River and the Dollart estuary. Its aim is to establish and improve contacts and levels of interaction between people, companies, and organisations within the border region. The organisation is based in the Dutch village of Bad Nieuweschans. Here, the office has developed into a Dutch-German center, where cross-border functions and other activities take place. The office also serves as an administration base and launching point for many cross-border projects.

== Members ==
The EDR consists of approximately 100 members including: Municipalities from the Dutch provinces of Groningen, Drenthe and Friesland, as well as from the German regions of East-Frisia, the Emsland and parts of the Cloppenburg region. Additionally, regional associations such as cultural organisations and chambers of commerce and industry are represented.

== Goals and Tasks ==
Since its establishment, the EDR has been active in the areas of spatial planning, infrastructure, culture and developing the regional economy. However, the EDR places special emphasis on its efforts to develop and intensify the contacts between the populations on both sides of the German-Dutch border.

In order to reach these goals, the EDR provides financial assistance for regional cross-border initiatives. The basis for these activities is provided by the contributions of EDR members. In addition, the EDR receives financial support from the Dutch provinces of Groningen, Drenthe and Friesland, as well as project associated contributions from the German federal state of Lower-Saxony. An important contributor to the activities of the EDR is the European Union, which contributes to cross-border activities as a part of its INTERREG-IVA program. This program provides subsidies to projects in the following areas: economy, technology and innovation, sustainable regional development, as well as integration and society.

Over the years, contacts and networks have been established among the people, businesses and organisations on both sides of the Dutch-German border. As a result of this closer interaction, it has become clear to many participants that significant obstacles to full co-operation remain. Differences in legal systems present the most significant obstacle to cross-border cooperation, but also differing customs and cultural expectations can add to the difficulties of cross-border initiatives. The EDR works to overcome these obstacles.

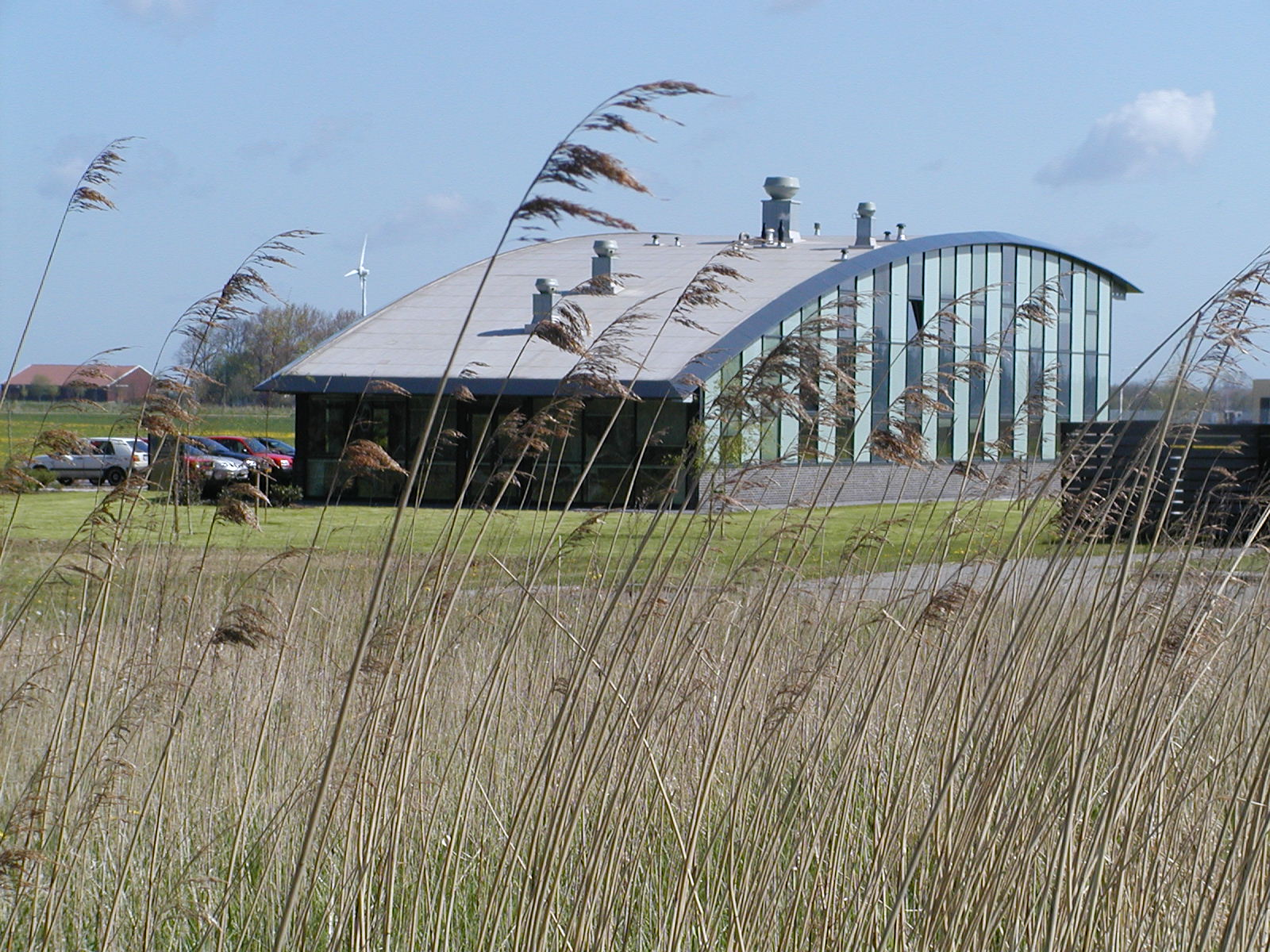
Office of the EDR in Bad Nieuweschans

== The EDR Council & Board of Directors ==
The EDR Council is the highest body of the EDR and consists of two representatives from each member. The EDR Council gathers twice yearly to receive news on important projects and discuss developments at the EDR. Each EDR member has one vote, which is used to elect the EDR Board of Directors.

The EDR Board of Directors is elected in bi-annual terms by the EDR Council. It consists of sixteen members, eight from Germany and eight from the Netherlands. Generally, the board sits monthly and prepares cross-border projects and initiatives. Further, the board represents the interests of the region in regional, national and European conventions. The position of chairman rotates between a German and Dutch representative every two years.

== See also ==
- EUREGIO
- Meuse-Rhine Euroregion
- List of euroregions
