= NUTS statistical regions of the Netherlands =

Statistical regions of the Netherlands

NUTS 2024 regions of the Netherlands: NUTS 1 by colour, NUTS 2 by shade, and NUTS 3 labelled with their codes

In the NUTS (Nomenclature of Territorial Units for Statistics) codes of the Netherlands (NL), the three levels are:

Level	Subdivisions	#
NUTS 1	Lands (Landsdelen)	4
NUTS 2	Provinces (Provincies)	12
NUTS 3	COROP regions (COROP-regio's)	40

== NUTS codes ==
The codes below follow the NUTS 2024 classification, which has applied since 1 January 2024.

NUTS 1	Code	NUTS 2	Code	NUTS 3	Code
North Netherlands	NL1	Groningen	NL11	East Groningen	NL114
North Netherlands	NL1	Groningen	NL11	Delfzijl and surroundings	NL112
North Netherlands	NL1	Groningen	NL11	Rest of Groningen	NL115
North Netherlands	NL1	Friesland	NL12	North Friesland	NL127
North Netherlands	NL1	Friesland	NL12	South West Friesland	NL128
North Netherlands	NL1	Friesland	NL12	South East Friesland	NL126
North Netherlands	NL1	Drenthe	NL13	North Drenthe	NL131
North Netherlands	NL1	Drenthe	NL13	South East Drenthe	NL132
North Netherlands	NL1	Drenthe	NL13	South West Drenthe	NL133
East Netherlands	NL2	Overijssel	NL21	North Overijssel	NL211
East Netherlands	NL2	Overijssel	NL21	South West Overijssel	NL212
East Netherlands	NL2	Overijssel	NL21	Twente	NL213
East Netherlands	NL2	Gelderland	NL22	Veluwe	NL221
East Netherlands	NL2	Gelderland	NL22	South West Gelderland	NL224
East Netherlands	NL2	Gelderland	NL22	Achterhoek	NL225
East Netherlands	NL2	Gelderland	NL22	Arnhem & Nijmegen	NL226
East Netherlands	NL2	Flevoland	NL23	Flevoland	NL230
West Netherlands (West-Nederland)	NL3	Utrecht	NL35	Utrecht	NL350
West Netherlands (West-Nederland)	NL3	North Holland	NL32	Kop van North Holland	NL321
West Netherlands (West-Nederland)	NL3	North Holland	NL32	Alkmaar and surroundings	NL328
West Netherlands (West-Nederland)	NL3	North Holland	NL32	IJmond	NL323
West Netherlands (West-Nederland)	NL3	North Holland	NL32	Haarlem agglomeration	NL32A
West Netherlands (West-Nederland)	NL3	North Holland	NL32	Zaanstreek	NL325
West Netherlands (West-Nederland)	NL3	North Holland	NL32	Greater Amsterdam	NL32B
West Netherlands (West-Nederland)	NL3	North Holland	NL32	Het Gooi and Vechtstreek	NL327
West Netherlands (West-Nederland)	NL3	South Holland	NL36	Leiden and Bollenstreek	NL363
West Netherlands (West-Nederland)	NL3	South Holland	NL36	The Hague	NL361
West Netherlands (West-Nederland)	NL3	South Holland	NL36	Delft and Westland	NL362
West Netherlands (West-Nederland)	NL3	South Holland	NL36	East South Holland	NL365
West Netherlands (West-Nederland)	NL3	South Holland	NL36	Rijnmond	NL366
West Netherlands (West-Nederland)	NL3	South Holland	NL36	South East South Holland	NL364
West Netherlands (West-Nederland)	NL3	Zeeland	NL34	Zeelandic Flanders	NL341
West Netherlands (West-Nederland)	NL3	Zeeland	NL34	Overig Zeeland	NL342
South Netherlands	NL4	North Brabant	NL41	West North Brabant	NL411
South Netherlands	NL4	North Brabant	NL41	Mid North Brabant	NL415
South Netherlands	NL4	North Brabant	NL41	North-East North Brabant	NL416
South Netherlands	NL4	North Brabant	NL41	South-East North Brabant	NL414
South Netherlands	NL4	Limburg	NL42	North Limburg	NL421
South Netherlands	NL4	Limburg	NL42	Mid Limburg	NL422
South Netherlands	NL4	Limburg	NL42	South Limburg	NL423

== Local administrative units ==
Below the NUTS levels, the two LAU (Local Administrative Units) levels are:

Level	Subdivisions	#
LAU 1	— (same as NUTS 3)	40
LAU 2	Municipalities (Gemeenten)	342

The LAU codes of the Netherlands can be downloaded here:

== See also ==
- Subdivisions of the Netherlands
- ISO 3166-2 codes of the Netherlands
- FIPS region codes of the Netherlands
