= EUREGIO =

Euroregion in Germany and the Netherlands

EUREGIO is a cross-border region between the Netherlands and Germany and the first Euroregion. It was founded in 1958 as a German Eingetragener Verein, and has been converted in 2016 into a public body based on the 1991 Treaty of Anholt (German: Anholter Vertrag, Dutch: Verdrag van Anholt). Participating communities are in Niedersachsen (Osnabrück, Landkreis Osnabrück, southern part of Landkreis Emsland, Bentheim) and Nordrhein-Westfalen (Münsterland) in Germany and parts of the Dutch provinces Gelderland, Overijssel and Drenthe. Participating cities in the region are Münster, Osnabrück, Gronau, Enschede, and Hengelo. The headquarters of the Euregio is located in the city of Gronau, at the Dutch border.

== History ==
=== Early beginnings and consolidation ===
In 1958, municipal associations on both sides of the border organised the first cross-border conference. An association on the German side, the ‘Interessensgemeinschaft Rhein-Ems’, had been founded as an intermunicipal interest association in 1954 by representatives of local business and local authority politicians of the Westmünsterland and the Grafschaft Bentheim and Lingen Kreise. Among its objectives were the improvement of the local and regional infrastructures, which, in the eyes of the local elites, deserved more attention on the part of the Land and federal governments. On the Dutch side of the border, this was followed by the establishment of its own inter-municipal association.

In 1962, the more informal Interessensgemeinschaft was replaced by the ‘Kommunalgemeinschaft Weser-Ems’, a public law intermunicipal body. A similar process of intermunicipal integration occurred in the adjoining Dutch border area where the municipalities in the areas of Twente and Gelderland founded the Belangengemeenschap Twente-Gelderland (later Samenwerkingsverband Twente, today Regio Twente) with the explicit objective of co-operating more closely with the Interessensgemeinschaft Rhein-Ems (later Kommunalgemeinschaft Rhein-Ems). Subsequently, a second association, the Samenwerkingsverband Oost-Gelderland (today Regio Achterhoek), was established in the Dutch border area. Today, the Kommunalgemeinschaft Rhein-Ems, the Regio Twente and the Regio Achterhoek together form the EUREGIO.

The EUREGIO Arbeitsgruppe (‘work group’) was founded in 1966 to operate as the informal board of the cross-border region. On the basis of regular meetings, it attempted to shift the EUREGIO’s work from purely project-based contacts towards a programmatic collaboration.

An important event was the establishment of the Alfred-Mozer-Kommission in 1970, responsible for cross-border initiatives in the cultural field. At the same time, a secretariat was established comprising two units on each side of the border and funded by membership fees. Two studies, in the fields of culture and economic affairs respectively, gave the secretariats a programmatic basis for the further development of the EUREGIO.

In the mid-seventies, the Arbeitsgruppe was given a formal basis by means of a statute (Satzung), and a common action programme was developed. This institutionalisation process ended with the Euregio-Rat in 1978, the first cross-border regional parliamentary assembly in Europe constituted by the political delegates of the member authorities.

In 1985, the separate secretariats were merged into a single Geschäftsstelle, located in Gronau (DE), situated 75m from the border, employing both Dutch and German staff. On the programmatic side, a ‘regional cross-border action programme’ was presented in 1987, outlining the general strategy for the EUREGIO for a twenty-year period (NEI nd). The elaboration of the programme was based on an agreement in 1984 between the German Federal ministry of economics, the Dutch ministry of economics and the German states of North Rhine-Westphalia and Lower Saxony. Funding was also provided by the European Commission. A steering committee was established, involving the partners in this agreement as well as the provinces, Bezirksregierungen and the EUREGIO. The action programme contained an economic and social analysis of the programme areas, and listed a series of measures aimed at promoting their socio-economic development.

This action programme constituted the main input for the first OP for the period 1989-1992, funded as pilot project under art. 10 ERDF. When the European Commission launched Interreg I in 1990, the EUREGIO reacted with the speedy elaboration of a second OP based on its accumulated experience.

=== The EUREGIO and Interreg ===
Long before Interreg was launched, the EUREGIO had been canvassing by the European Commission for CBC support. As early as 1972, the European Commission, together with national sponsors, helped to finance the elaboration of a first cross-border development plan for the EUREGIO. A similar solution was found for the 1987 action programme before the EUREGIO succeeded in attracting a substantial amount of European funding under art. 10 ERDF for a series of pilot projects at the end of the eighties. However, the ‘big bang’ for the EUREGIO was the launch of the Interreg I CI in 1989 involving a major push in the EU’s funding for cross-border projects.

The introduction of Interreg meant that the operations were expanded significantly as it was granted the programme management for the Interreg OP. The relevant procedural details were agreed between the partners in the so-called ‘Interreg-Vereinbarung’. This gave the EUREGIO responsibility for the general programme and financial management, including the elaboration of the OP; the collection, evaluation and preliminary approval/rejection of project applications and their submission to the SC; and the co-ordination of the match-funds.

The EUREGIO was thus granted an important role in the administrative procedures for Interreg-supported projects. All project proposals are collected by the secretariat where a first preselection is made based on the basis of the EUREGIO’s own criteria, the general Interreg requirements and the prevailing legislation for the territories of the member authorities. The strict EUREGIO criteria require all projects to have a genuine cross-border character in substantial, organisational, personal and financial respects. As the relevant agreement states, projects must relate to a ‘Euregional interest’, linked to a structural and socio-economic significance for the region (EUREGIO and Rhein-Ems 1996: 29).

The approved proposals are submitted to the Steering Committee which is the highest instance in Interreg decision-making. As with the other Euroregions on the Dutch-German border, for the EUREGIO a separate SC has been established. Apart from the EUREGIO representatives, the Committee is composed of senior civil servants representing the following authorities: the Dutch ministry for Economics, and the provinces Drenthe, Overijssel and Gelderland on the Dutch side, and the Ministries of Economics of the German states of North Rhine-Westphalia and Lower Saxony as well as the Bezirksregierungen Münster and Weser-Ems on the German side.

The EUREGIO proposes the president of the SC and runs its secretariat. The SC is responsible for final project approval and requires unanimous decision-making whereby each of the authorities mentioned has one vote. It also serves as the Monitoring Committee under EU regulations, involving the Commission and the German federal Ministry of Economics as additional members.

The Interreg agreements significantly simplify the financial management. For the three Euroregions on its territory, the NRW Land administration has accepted the full and sole responsibility vis-à-vis the European Commission for the lawful implementation of the Interreg OP on behalf of the Dutch central state and Lower Saxony.

At the same time, a bank, the Investitionsbank Nordrhein-Westfalen (IB), manages the non-local EUREGIO Interreg funds. All EU and national match-funds, the Dutch contributions included, are paid into a single account. This simplifies the Interreg-related procedures by allowing the Interreg subsidies to be paid to the project leaders in a single assignment. The IB concludes private law contracts with the project leaders specifying the details realising the projects, replacing up to eight public law assignments from up to eight different authorities. The IB also audits the funds on behalf of all other interested parties. To simplify the programme implementation within its own administrative realm, the NRW has established a single Interreg-budget comprehending all match-funds from different ministries. Due to these streamlined procedures, projects are in general approved within three to six months (Deloitte & Touche 1998: 22).

As for the substantive content for the Interreg measures, the Interreg agreements define six policy fields as the general framework for the OPs to be submitted for each Euroregion in the areas. Within this general framework, the Euroregions autonomously determine the priorities within their own OPs.

== See also ==
- Ems Dollart Region
- Meuse-Rhine Euroregion
- List of euroregions
