= Duchy of Schleswig =

Danish Duchy from 1058 to 1864

Coordinates: 55°10′N 9°15′E

Duchy of Schleswig Hertugdømmet Slesvig (Danish) Herzogtum Schleswig (German)
- 1058–1866
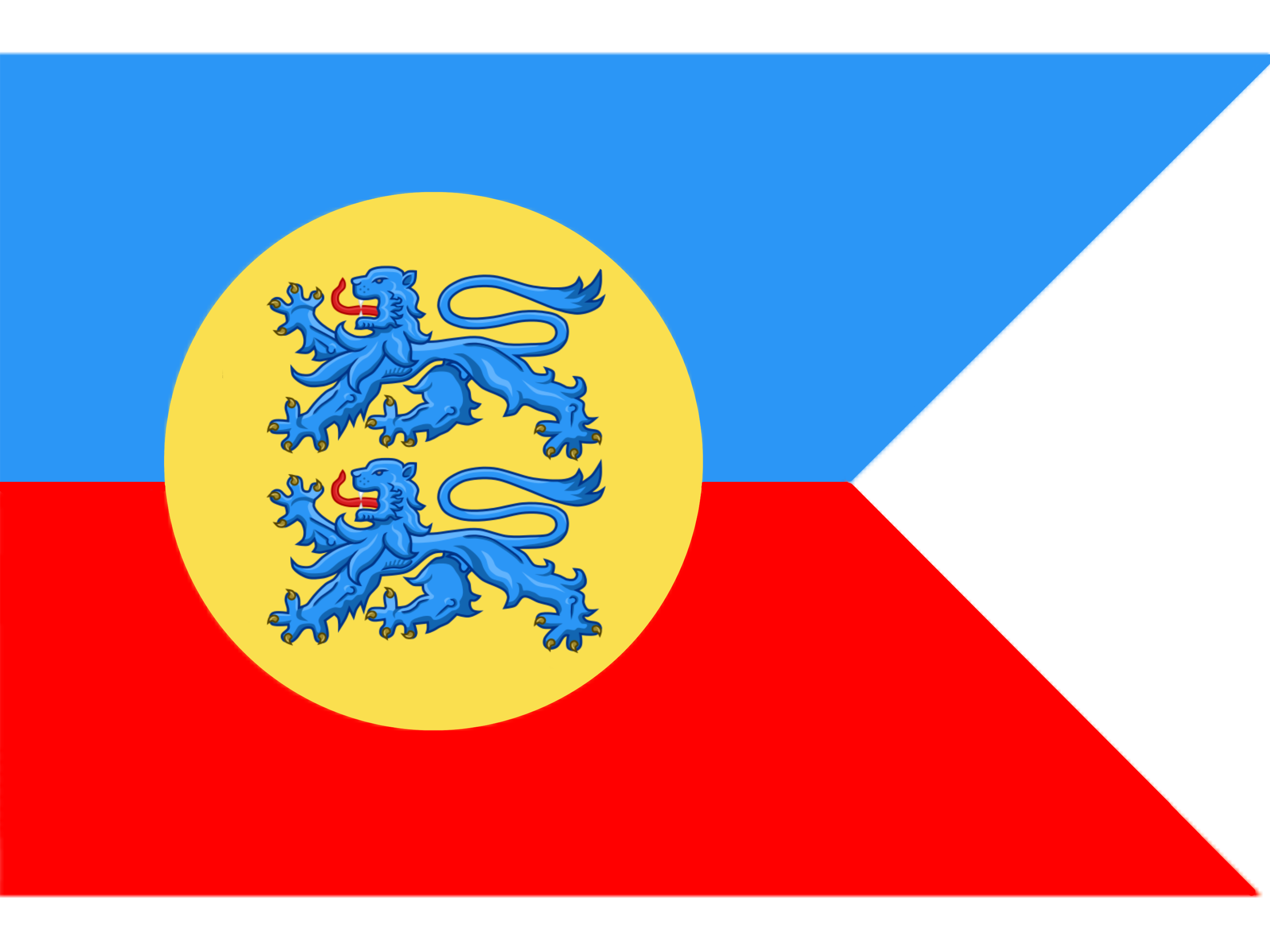
- Top: 18th century flag Bottom: Dannebrog used between 1685 to 1849 Coat of arms

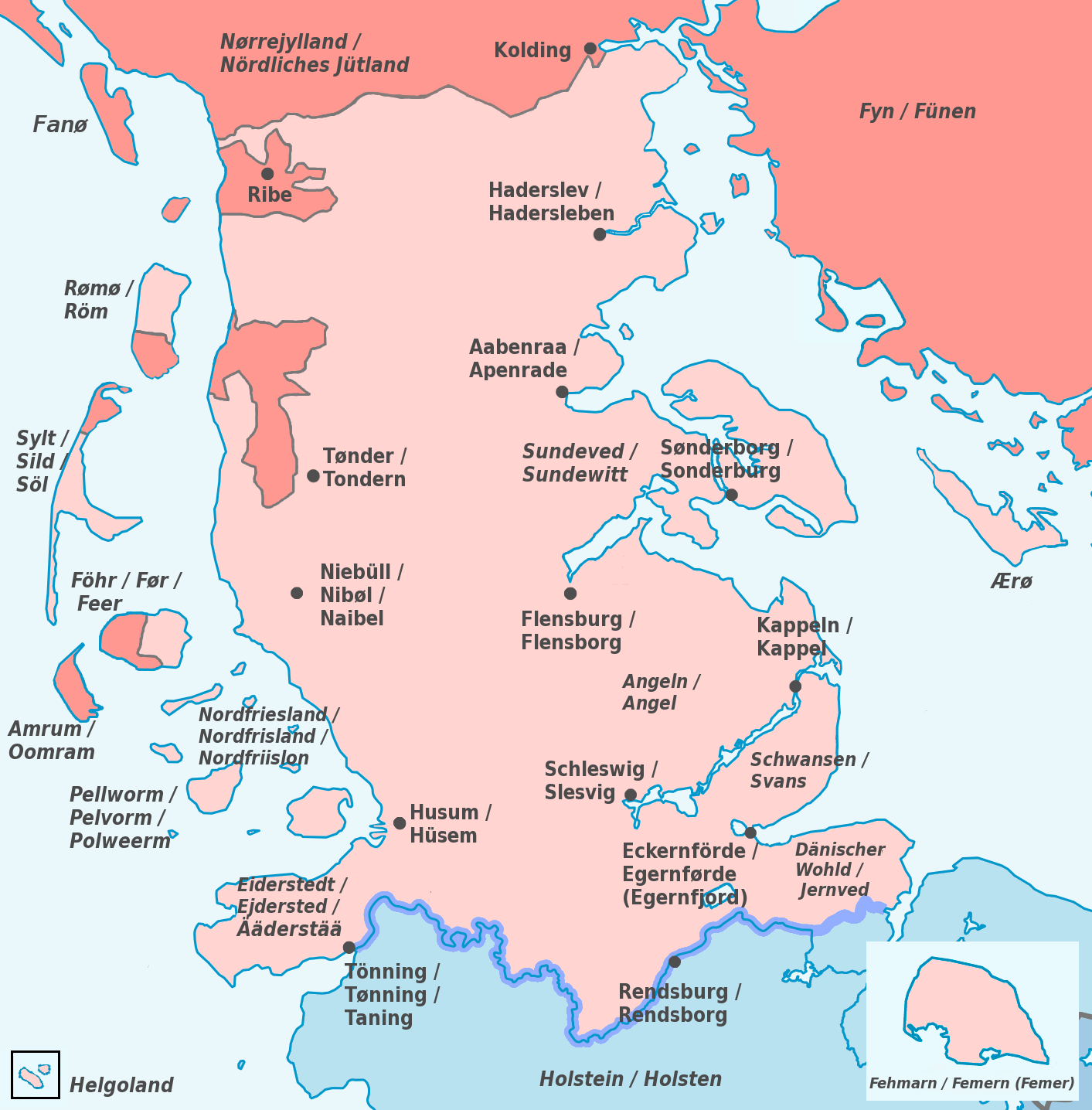
- Status: Fiefdom of the Danish Crown (partly between 1544 and 1713/20)
- Capital: Schleswig, Flensburg, Copenhagen
- Common languages: Danish; German; Low German; North Frisian
- Religion: Catholicism, Lutheranism and Mennonitism (from the 16th century), Judaism
- Government: Feudal duchy, monarchy
- Duke
  - 1058–1095: Olaf I of Denmark
  - 1863–66: Christian IX of Denmark
- History
  - Established: 1058
  - Disestablished: 1866
- Currency: Schleswig-Holstein speciethaler, Danish rigsdaler, Pfennig
Preceded by	Succeeded by
North Sea Empire	Province of Schleswig-Holstein
- Today part of: Denmark; Germany

The Duchy of Schleswig (/ˈʃlɛswɪɡ/; German: [ˈʃleːsvɪç]; Danish: Hertugdømmet Slesvig; German: Herzogtum Schleswig; Low German: Hartogdom Sleswig; North Frisian: Härtochduum Slaswik) was a duchy in Southern Jutland (Sønderjylland) covering the area between about 60 km (35 miles) north and 70 km (45 mi) south of the current border between Germany and Denmark. The territory has been divided between the two countries since 1920, with Northern Schleswig in Denmark and Southern Schleswig in Germany. The region is also called Sleswick in English.

Unlike Holstein and Lauenburg, Schleswig was never a part of the German Confederation. Schleswig was instead a fief of Denmark, and its inhabitants spoke Danish, German, and North Frisian. Both Danish and German National Liberals wanted Schleswig to be part of a Danish or German national state in the 19th century. A German uprising in March 1848 caused the First Schleswig War which ended in 1852. The Second Schleswig War (1864) ended with the three duchies being governed jointly by Austria and Prussia. In 1866, they became a part of Prussia following the Austro-Prussian War.

== Name and naming dispute ==
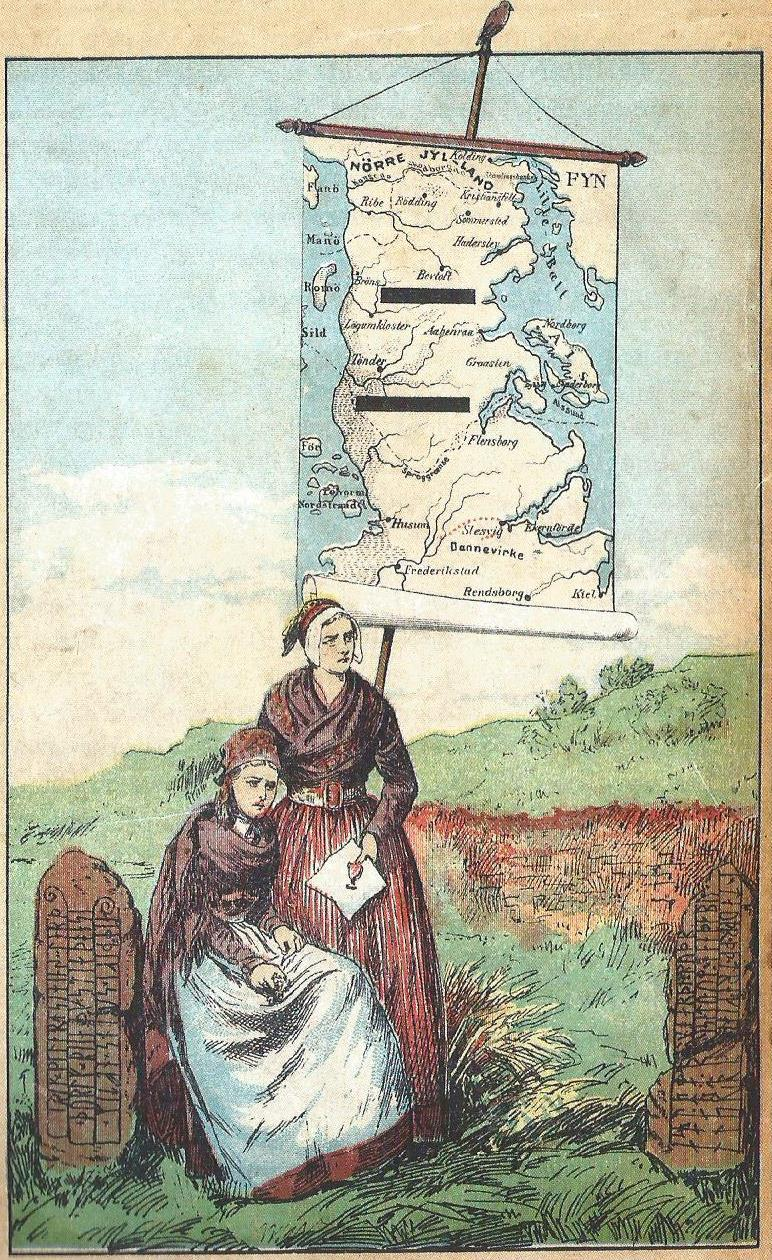
The term Sønderjylland was forbidden by the Prussians in 1895. The picture shows two girls in costumes of the islands Föhr and Als before the Dannevirke

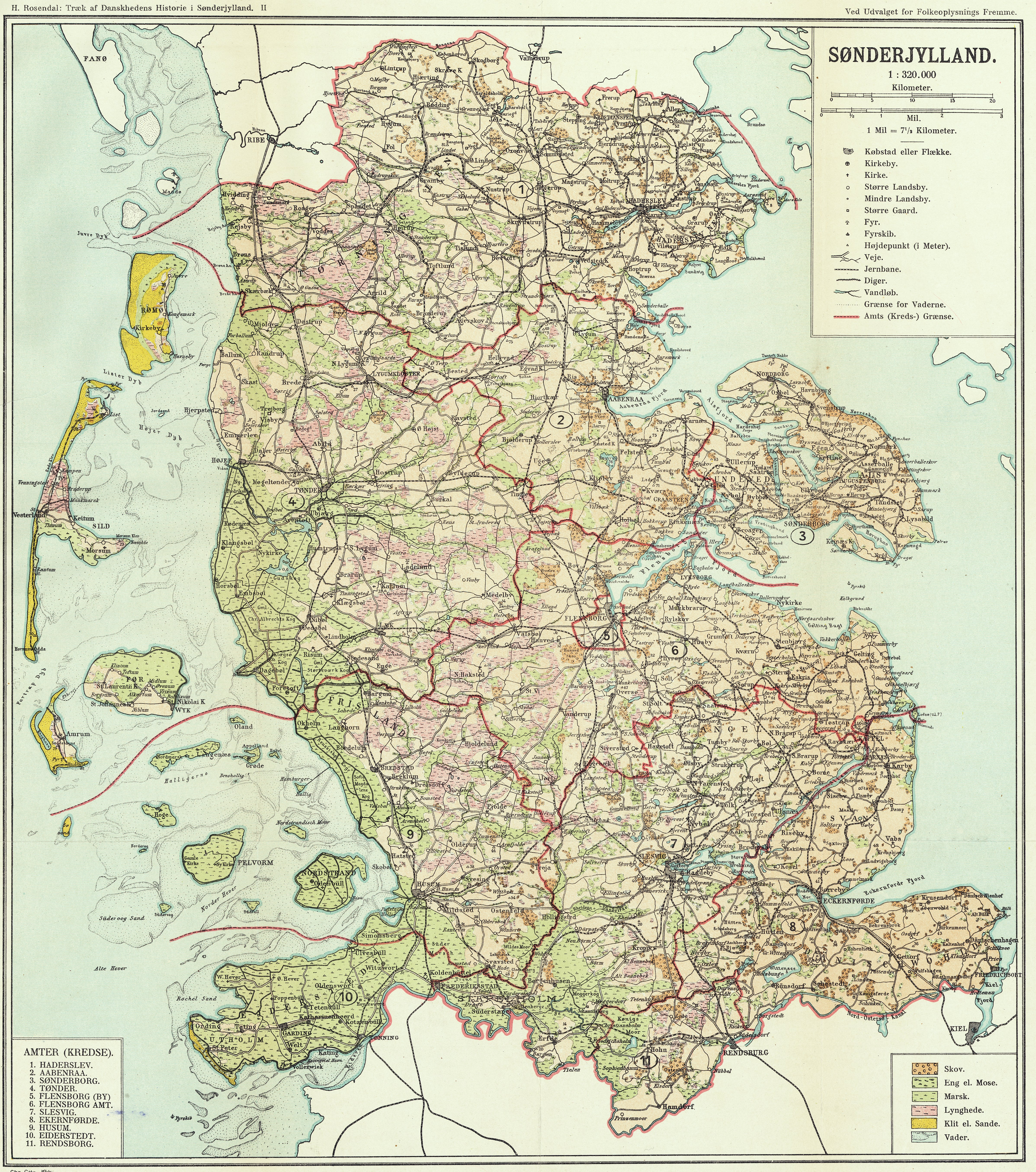
Danish Map of Southern Jutland (1918)

In the 19th century, there was a naming dispute concerning the use of Schleswig or Slesvig and Sønderjylland (Southern Jutland). Originally the duchy was called Sønderjylland but in the late 14th century the name of the city Slesvig (now Schleswig) started to be used for the whole territory. The term Sønderjylland was hardly used between the 16th and 19th centuries, and in this period the name Schleswig had no special political connotations. However, around 1830 some Danes started to re-introduce the archaic term Sønderjylland to emphasize the area's history before its association with Holstein and its connection with the rest of Jutland.

A central element of the German nationalist claim was the insistence on Schleswig and Holstein being a single, indivisible entity (as they had been declared to be in the Treaty of Ribe 1460). Since Holstein was legally part of the German Confederation, and ethnically entirely German with no Danish population, use of that name implied that both provinces should belong to Germany and that their connection with Denmark should be weakened or altogether severed.

After the German conquest in 1864, the term Sønderjylland became increasingly dominant among the Danish population, even though most Danes still had no objection to the use of Schleswig as such (it is etymologically of Danish origin) and many of them still used it themselves in its Danish version Slesvig. An example is the founding of De Nordslesvigske Landboforeninger (The North Schleswig Farmers Association). In 1866, Schleswig and Holstein were legally merged into the Prussian province of Schleswig-Holstein.

The naming dispute was resolved with the 1920 plebiscites and partition, each side applying its preferred name to the part of the territory remaining in its possession – though both terms can, in principle, still refer to the entire region. Northern Schleswig was, after the 1920 plebiscites, officially named the Southern Jutland districts (de sønderjyske landsdele), while Southern Schleswig then remained a part of the Prussian province, which became the German state of Schleswig-Holstein in 1946.

== History ==
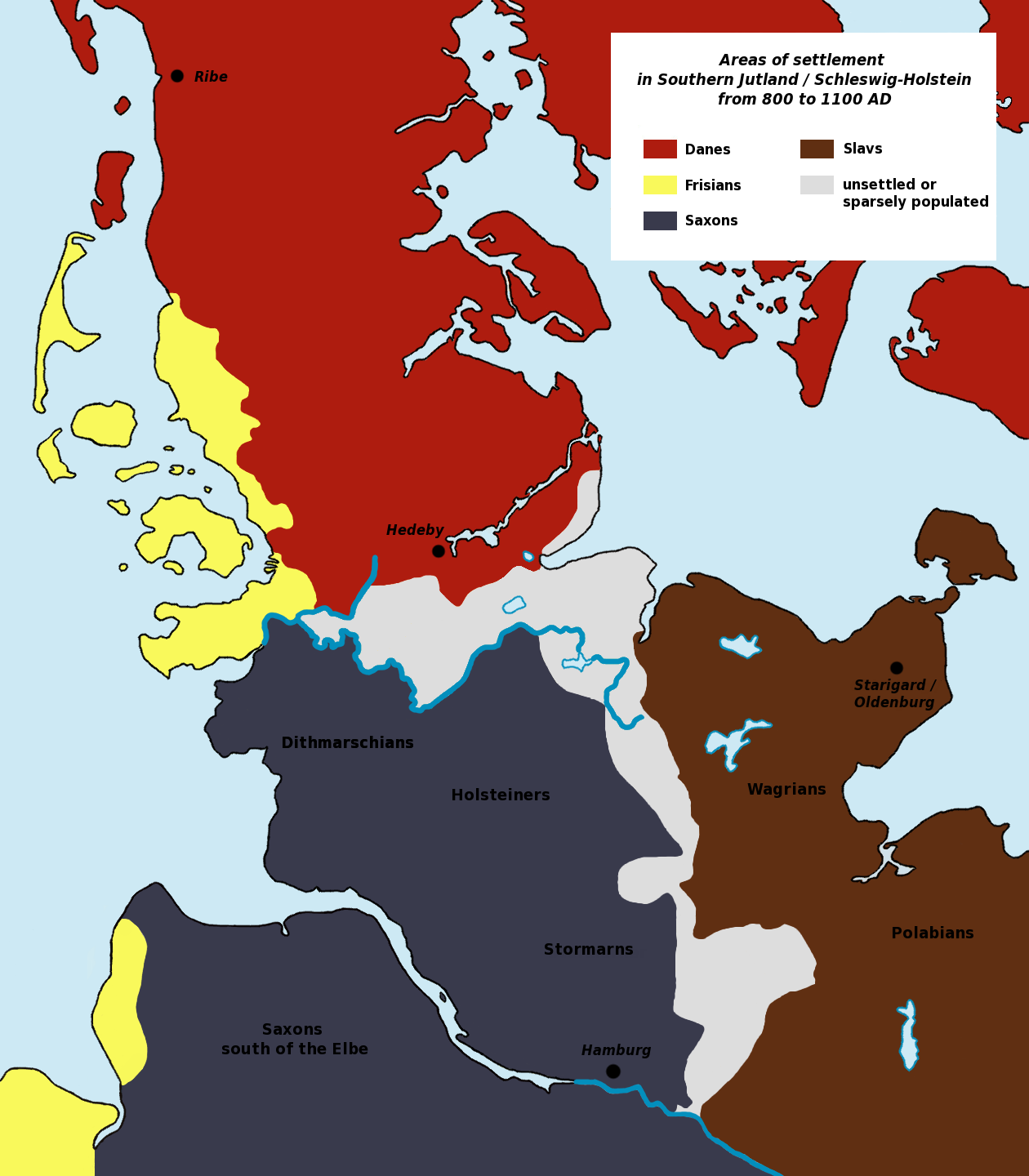
The Danish (red), Saxon (blue), Frisian (yellow) and Slavic (brown) settlement areas in Schleswig/Southern Jutland and Holstein (from 800 to 1100)

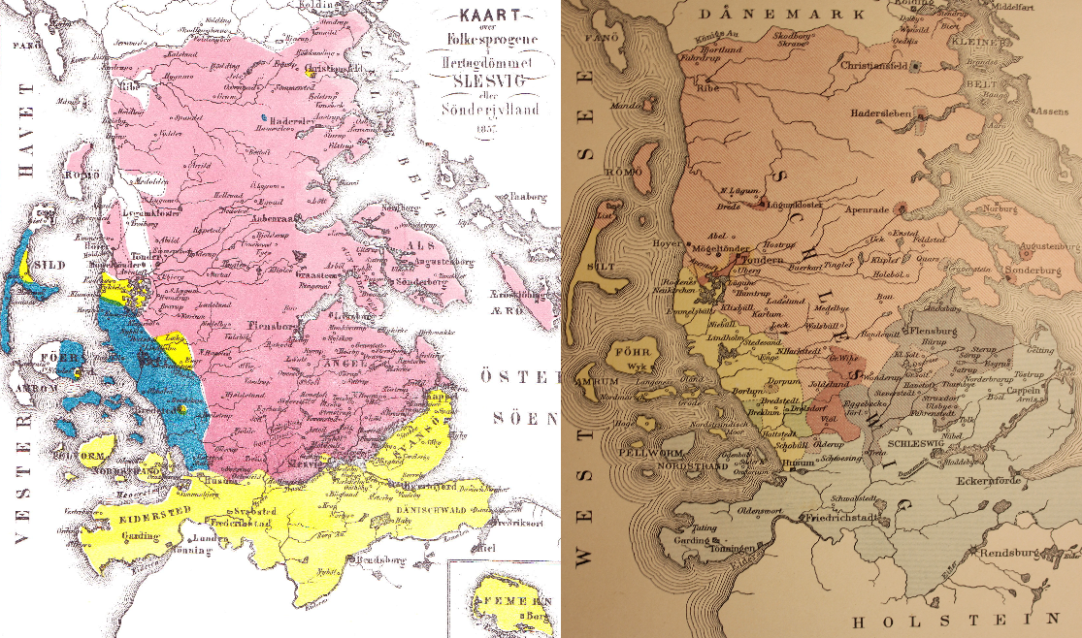
Language shift in the 19th century in Southern Schleswig, showing a Danish and a German language map

From early medieval times, the area's significance was its role as a buffer zone between Denmark and the powerful Holy Roman Empire to the south, as well as being a transit area for the transfer of goods between the North Sea and the Baltic Sea, connecting the trade route through Russia with the trade routes along the Rhine and the Atlantic coast (see also Kiel Canal). In the earliest records, no distinction is made between North Jutland and South Jutland.

=== Early history ===
Roman sources place the homeland of the tribe of Jutes north of the river Eider and that of the Angles south of it. The Angles in turn bordered the neighbouring Saxons. By the early Middle Ages, the region was inhabited by three groups:

- Danes (including assimilated Jutes), who lived north of the Danevirke and the Eckernförde Bay,
- North Frisians, who lived in most of North Frisia, including on the North Frisian Islands, and
- Saxons (including Germanized Wagrians and Wends), who lived in the area south of the Danes and the Frisians.

During the 14th century, the population on Schwansen began to speak Low German alongside Danish, but otherwise the ethno-linguistic borders remained remarkably stable until around 1800, with the exception of the population in the towns that became increasingly German from the 14th century onward.

During the early Viking Age, Hedeby – Scandinavia's biggest trading centre – was located in this region, which is also the location of the interlocking fortifications known as the Danewerk or Danevirke. Its construction, and in particular its great expansion around 737, has been interpreted as an indication of the emergence of a unified Danish state. In May 1931, scientists of the National Museum of Denmark announced that they had unearthed eighteen Viking graves with the remains of eighteen men in them. The discovery came during excavations in Schleswig. The skeletons indicated that the men were bigger proportioned than twentieth-century Danish men. Each of the graves was laid out from east to west. Researchers surmised that the bodies were entombed in wooden coffins originally, but only the iron nails remained. Towards the end of the Early Middle Ages, Schleswig formed part of the historical Lands of Denmark as Denmark unified out of a number of petty chiefdoms in the 8th to 10th centuries in the wake of Viking expansion.

The southern boundary of Denmark in the region of the Eider River and the Danevirke was a source of continuous dispute. The Treaty of Heiligen was signed in 811 between the Danish King Hemming and Charlemagne, by which the border was established at the Eider. During the 10th century, there were several wars between East Francia and Denmark. In 1027, Conrad II and Canute the Great again fixed their mutual border at the Eider.

In 1115, King Niels created his nephew Canute Lavard – a son of his predecessor Eric I – Earl of Schleswig, a title used for only a short time before the recipient began to style himself duke.

In the 1230s, Southern Jutland (the Duchy of Slesvig) was allotted as an appanage to Abel Valdemarsen, Canute's great-grandson, a younger son of Valdemar II of Denmark. Abel, having wrested the Danish throne to himself for a brief period, left his duchy to his sons and their successors, who pressed claims to the throne of Denmark for much of the next century, so that the Danish kings were at odds with their cousins, the dukes of Slesvig. Feuds and marital alliances brought the Abel dynasty into a close connection with the German Duchy of Holstein by the 15th century. The latter was a fief subordinate to the Holy Roman Empire, while Schleswig remained a Danish fief. These dual loyalties were to become a main root of the dispute between the German states and Denmark in the 19th century, when the ideas of romantic nationalism and the nation-state gained popular support.

=== Early modern times ===
The title of duke of Schleswig was inherited in 1460 by the hereditary kings of Norway, who were also regularly elected kings of Denmark simultaneously, and their sons (unlike Denmark, which was not hereditary). This was an anomaly – a king holding a ducal title of which he as king was the fount and liege lord. The title and anomaly survived presumably because it was already co-regally held by the king's sons.

Between 1544 and 1713/20, the ducal reign had become a common dominium, with the royal House of Oldenburg and its cadet branch House of Holstein-Gottorp jointly holding the stake. A third branch, the short-lived House of Haderslev, was already extinct in 1580 by the time of John the Elder.

Following the Protestant Reformation, when Latin was replaced as the medium of church service by the vernacular languages, the diocese of Schleswig was divided and an autonomous archdeaconry of Haderslev created. On the west coast, the Danish diocese of Ribe ended about 5 km (3 mi) north of the present border. This created a new cultural dividing line in the duchy because German was used for church services and teaching in the diocese of Schleswig and Danish was used in the diocese of Ribe and the archdeaconry of Haderslev. This line corresponds remarkably closely with the present border.

In the 17th century, a series of wars between Denmark and Sweden—which Denmark lost—devastated the region economically. However, the nobility responded with a new agricultural system that restored prosperity. In the period 1600 to 1800 the region experienced the growth of manorialism of the sort common in the rye-growing regions of eastern Germany. The manors were large holdings with the work done by feudal peasant farmers. They specialized in high quality dairy products. Feudal lordship was combined with technical modernization, and the distinction between unfree labour and paid work was often vague. The feudal system was gradually abolished in the late 18th century, starting with the crown lands in 1765 and later the estates of the nobility. In 1805, all serfdom was abolished and land tenure reforms allowed former peasants to own their own farms.

=== 19th century and the two Schleswig wars ===
From around 1800 to 1840, the Danish-speaking population on the Angeln peninsula between Schleswig and Flensburg began to switch to Low German and in the same period many North Frisians also switched to Low German. This linguistic change created a new de facto dividing line between German and Danish speakers north of Tønder and south of Flensburg.

From around 1830, large segments of the population began to identify with either German or Danish nationality and mobilized politically. In Denmark, the National Liberal Party used the Schleswig question as part of their agitation and demanded that the duchy be incorporated into the Danish kingdom under the slogan "Denmark to the Eider". This caused a conflict between Denmark and the German states over Schleswig and Holstein, which led to the Schleswig-Holstein question of the 19th century.

When the National Liberals came to power in Denmark in early 1848, it provoked an uprising of ethnic Germans in the duchies. This led to the First Schleswig War (1848–51). The Schleswig-Holsteiners were supported by the German Confederation of which Holstein (and Lauenburg) was a member state. Although Schleswig was never a part of the Confederation, the Confederation (and the short-lived German Empire of that time) treated Schleswig largely as such. The ideological argument was not only an ethnic but also a historical one: the German side referred to a medieval treaty that claimed that Schleswig and Holstein should be forever united (in Low German: up ewig ungedeelt). The federal and then imperial troops consisted mainly of Prussian divisions.

Under pressure of the other great powers, Prussia had to retreat (in summer 1848 and again in summer 1850). This left the Schleswig-Holstein rebels to their fate. In 1851 the rebel government and its army were disbanded. In the London Protocol of 1852 the great powers confirmed that the king of Denmark was the duke of the duchies but also the status of the duchies as being distinct from Denmark proper.

Denmark again attempted to integrate Schleswig by creating a new common constitution (the so-called November Constitution) for Denmark and Schleswig in 1863. This was met by German states in two ways:

- The German Confederation sent troops to Holstein (and Lauenburg) which was a member state. This internal Bundesexekution was meant to force the duke (i.e. the king of Denmark) to respect the status of the duchy. The troops occupying Holstein were mainly from Hanover and Saxony, with Austrian and Prussian troops waiting as a reserve.
- Austria and Prussia, against the will of the Confederation, in February 1864 sent their troops across the border between Holstein and Schleswig. Occupying Schleswig also was supposed to have influence on the Danish king, originally. This war, the Second Schleswig War, was unrelated to the Confederation. (The Bundesexekution became meaningless.)

The defeated Danish king had to leave Schleswig and Holstein to Austria and Prussia. They created a condominium over Schleswig and Holstein. Under the Gastein Convention of 14 August 1865, Lauenburg was given to Prussia, while Austria administered Holstein, and Prussia administered Schleswig.

However, tensions between the two German powers culminated in the Austro-Prussian War of 1866. Following the Peace of Prague, the victorious Prussians annexed both Schleswig and Holstein, creating the Province of Schleswig-Holstein. Provision for the cession of northern Schleswig to Denmark was made pending a popular vote in favour of this. In 1878, however, Austria-Hungary went back on this provision, and Denmark recognized in a treaty of 1907 with Germany that, by the agreement between Austria and Prussia, the frontier between Prussia and Denmark had finally been settled.

=== Since 1900 ===
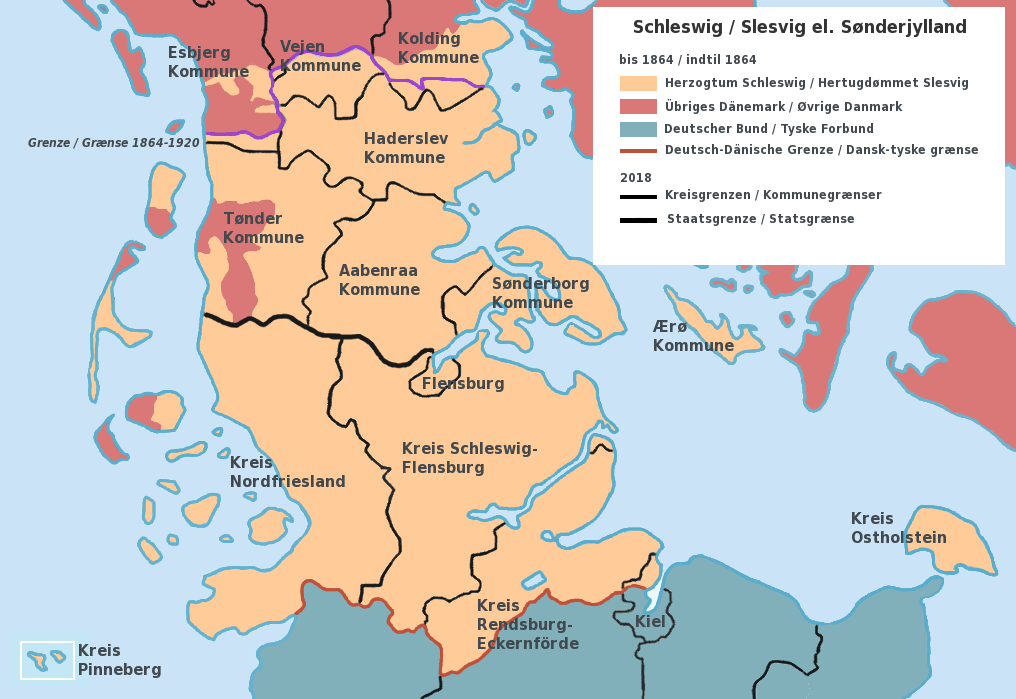
Schleswig/Slesvig with present-day administrative borders

The Treaty of Versailles provided for plebiscites to determine the allegiance of the region. Thus, two referendums were held in 1920, resulting in the partition of the region. Northern Schleswig voted by a majority of 75% to join Denmark, whereas Central Schleswig voted by a majority of 80% to remain part of Germany. In Southern Schleswig, no referendum was held, as the likely outcome was apparent. The name Southern Schleswig is now used for all of German Schleswig. This decision left substantial minorities on both sides of the new border.

Following the Second World War, a substantial part of the German population in Southern Schleswig changed their nationality and declared themselves as Danish. This change was caused by a number of factors, most importantly the German defeat and an influx of a large number of refugees from the former Prussian eastern provinces, whose culture and appearance differed from the local Germans, who were mostly descendants of Danish families who had changed their nationality in the 19th century.

The change in demographics created a temporary Danish majority in the region and a demand for a new referendum from the Danish population in South Schleswig and some Danish politicians, including prime minister Knud Kristensen. However, the majority in the Danish parliament refused to support a referendum in South Schleswig, fearing that the "new Danes" were not genuine in their change of nationality. This proved to be the case and, from 1948 the Danish population began to shrink again. By the early 1950s, it had nevertheless stabilised at a level four times higher than the pre-war number.

In the Copenhagen-Bonn declaration of 1955, West Germany (later Germany as a whole) and Denmark promised to uphold the rights of each other's minority population. Today, both parts co-operate as a cross-border Euroregion: Region Sønderjylland–Schleswig. As Denmark and Germany are both part of the Schengen Area, there are no regular controls at the border.

== See also ==
- Coat of arms of Schleswig
- Danevirke
- German Bight
- Jutland
- Hedeby
- History of Schleswig-Holstein
- North Frisian Islands
- Schleswig-Holstein Question
- Traditional districts of Denmark
- Region Sønderjylland-Schleswig
- Danish Royal Enclaves
- Province of Schleswig-Holstein
