= CBCP =

CBCP may refer to one of the following:

- Center Beam Candle Power
- Certified Building Commissioning Professional, an Association of Energy Engineers certification
- Cross-Border Co-operation Process, a European union initiative
- Catholic Bishops' Conference of the Philippines
- Certified Business Continuity Professional
- Chicago Bulls College Prep, a high school in Chicago
- City Boundary Coordination Project, a large scale project in City Boundaries of Iran
