= Adsbøl =

Village in Sønderborg, Southern Denmark

- Village
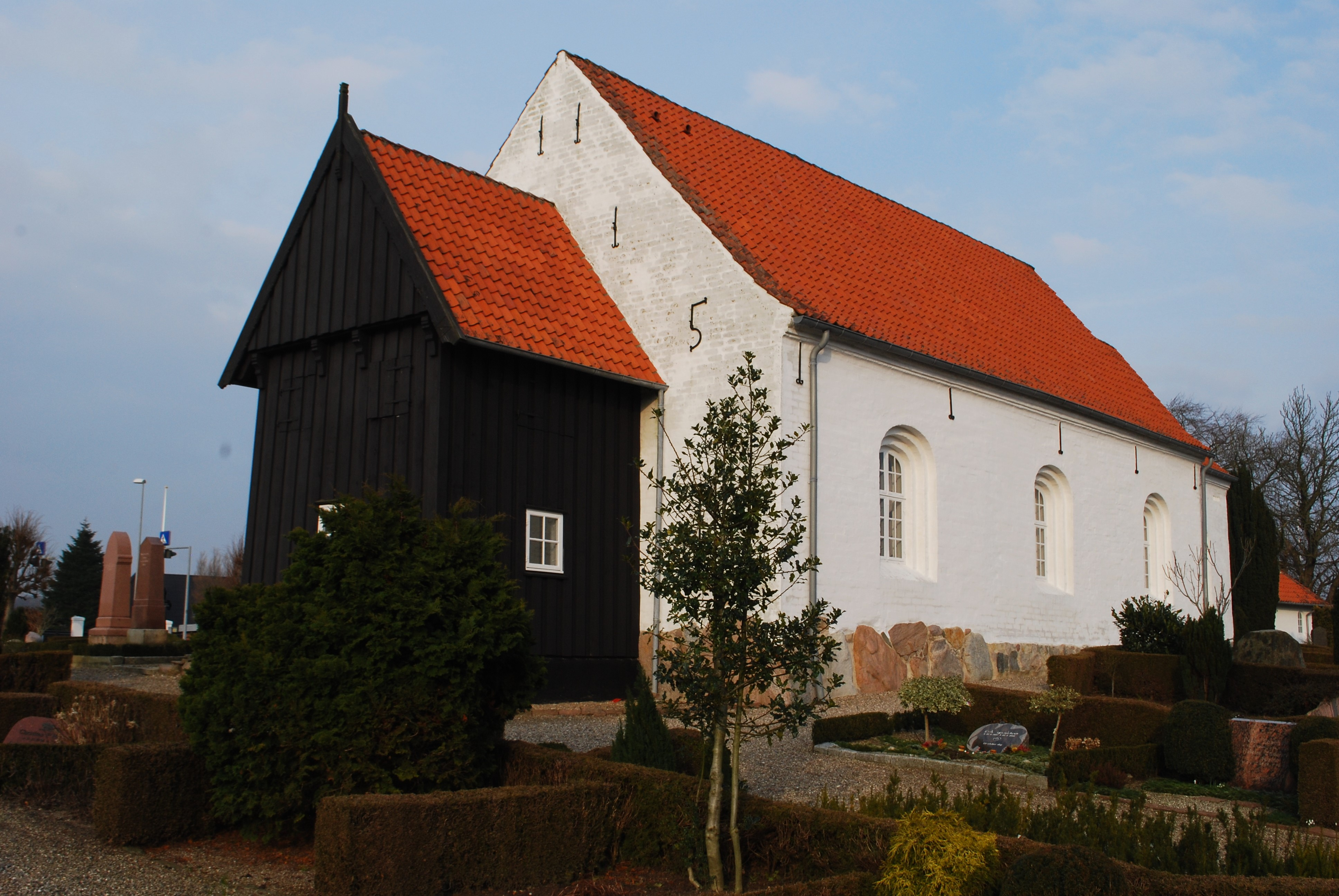
- Adsbøl Church

- Location in Region of Southern Denmark Adsbøl (Denmark)
- Coordinates: 54°56′21″N 9°37′15″E
- Country: Denmark
- Region: Southern Denmark
- Municipality: Sønderborg

Population (2026)
  - Total: 310

Adsbøl is a village in Sønderborg Municipality, Region of Southern Denmark in Denmark. It is located 2 km northeast of Gråsten and has a population of 310 (1 January 2026).

== See also ==
- Southern Jutland
