= Sønderjysk kaffebord =

Traditional spread of cakes and coffee

A sønderjysk kaffebord (English: Southern Jutland coffee table) is a traditional spread of various cakes, served on a table with coffee.

After southern Jutland became part of Prussia in 1864, many national gatherings were held, but the Prussian authorities did not always grant liquor to the taverns where the Danish-minded met. In response, assembly houses were built where the Danish-minded could hold meetings. These gatherings featured coffee and cakes, with participants bringing home-baked goods to cover the long tables. Competition among the women was fierce, as they sought to bake the most delicious and eye-catching cakes. Pies and layer cakes were considered the ultimate test of a housewife's skill. The tradition saw a resurgence during World War II, when it was illegal to hold meetings but not to host coffee tables. Southerners cleverly used this loophole to meet legally.

The kaffebord was especially popular on self-sufficient farms, where ingredients like eggs, sugar, flour, and cream were abundant. These lavish spreads emerged in a time when daily life was marked by hard physical labor and spartan meals. As a result, the kaffebord became a festive highlight for annual celebrations and major events. The table was expected to be so generous that it could easily serve twice as many people as were present, and new guests were often invited in the following days to share.

One reason the kaffebord of Southern Jutland stood out compared to the rest of the country was the special serving style, which persisted in private homes well into the 20th century. Cake dishes were passed around one after another and the participants piled up three or four varieties on their plates.
