= CBCR =

CBCR may refer to:

- CbCr, the blue-difference and red-difference chroma components in the family of color spaces used as a part of the color image pipeline in video and digital photography systems
- CBCR-FM, the Kirkland Lake rebroadcaster of CBCS-FM
- Cross-Border Cooperation and Reconciliation, a USAID-funded project
