= Schleswig–Holstein question =

19th century European geopolitical dispute

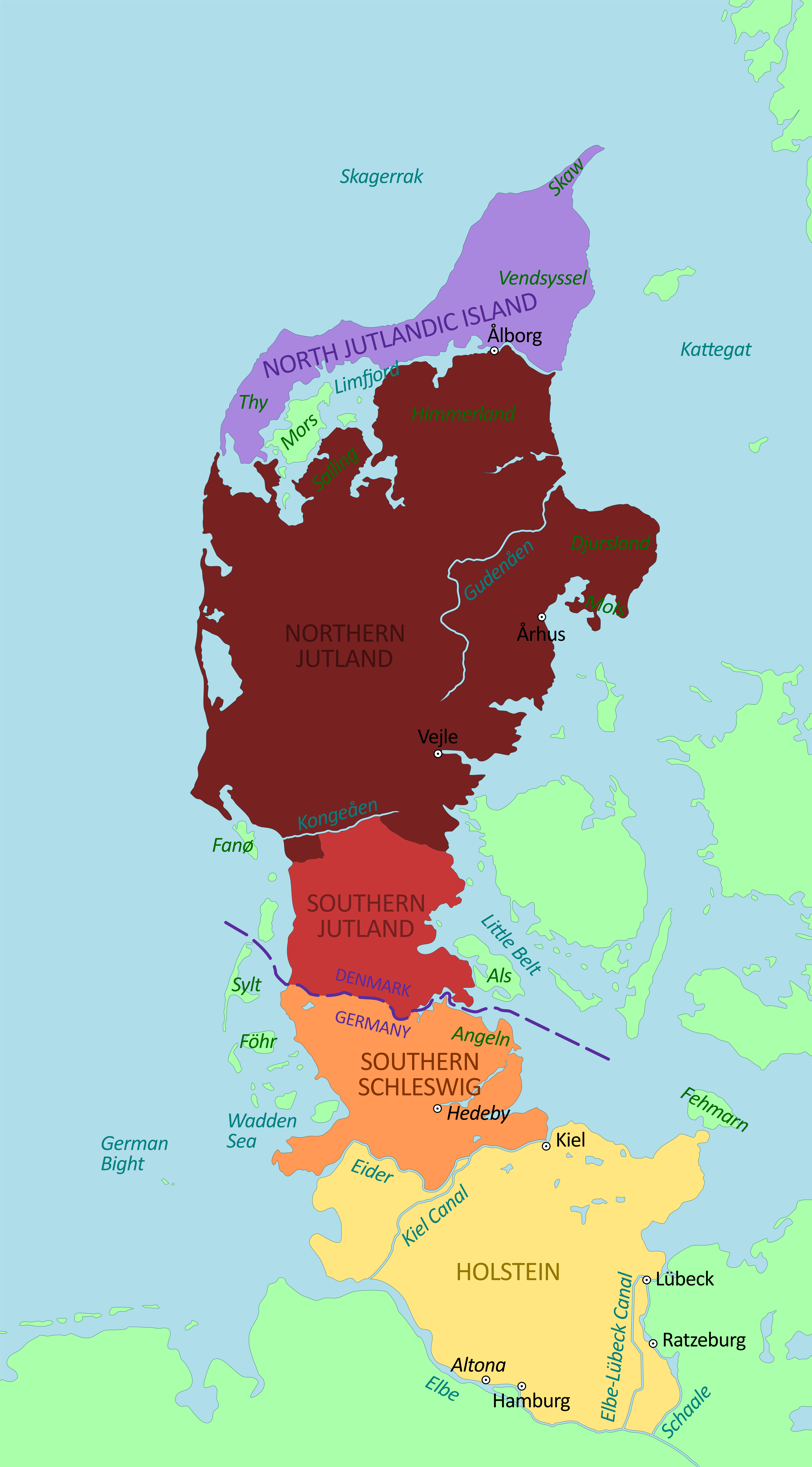
The Jutland peninsula showing the modern border between Denmark and Germany. Holstein is shown in yellow, southern Schleswig in orange, northern Schleswig in red, and the other Danish parts of Jutland in dark red.

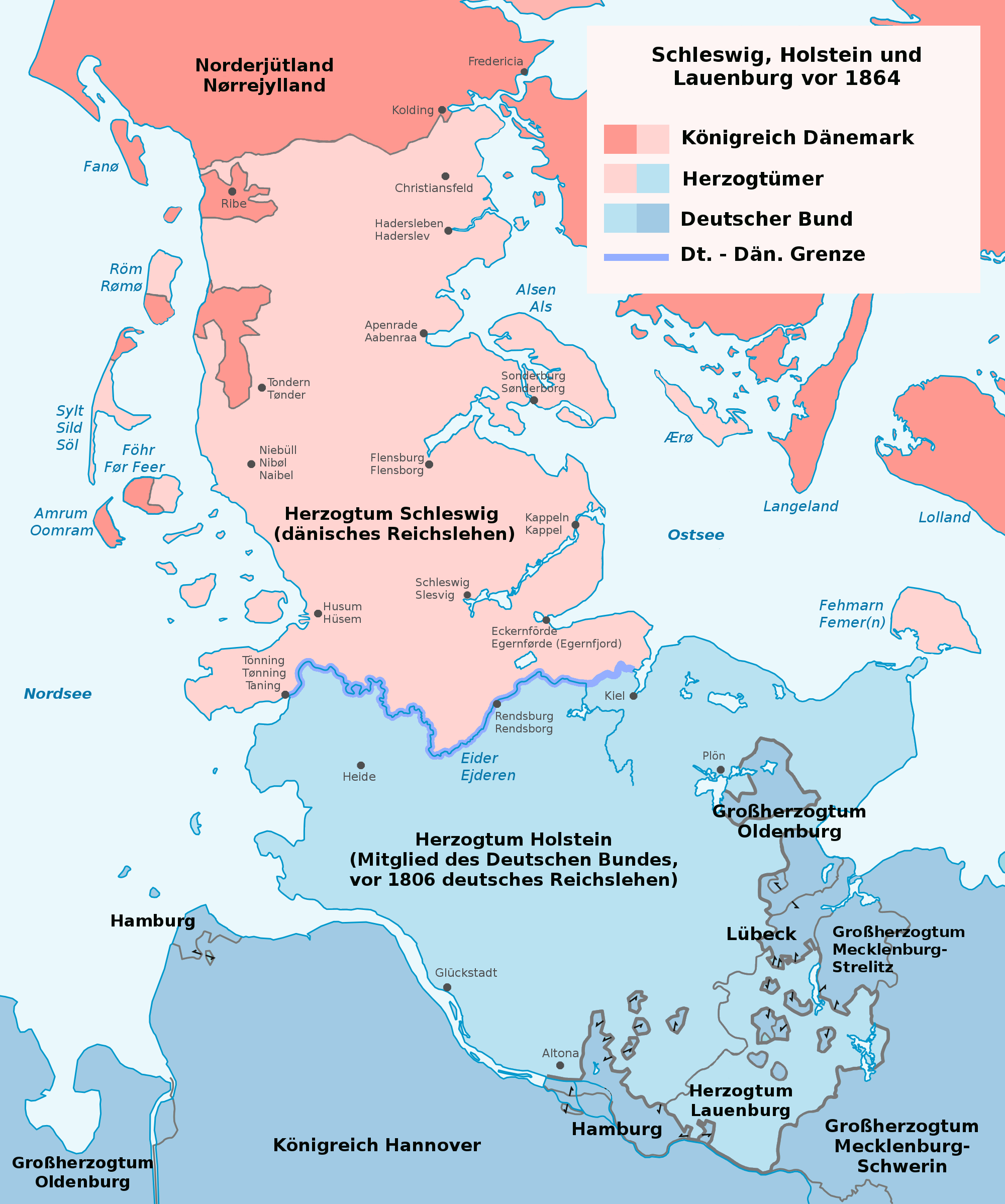
Schleswig and Holstein before the Second Schleswig War

The Schleswig–Holstein question (German: Schleswig-Holsteinische Frage; Danish: Spørgsmålet om Sønderjylland og Holsten) was a complex set of diplomatic and other issues arising in the 19th century from the relations of two duchies, Schleswig (Sønderjylland/Slesvig) and Holstein (Holsten), to the Danish Crown, to the German Confederation, and to each other.

Schleswig was part of Denmark during the Viking Age, and became a Danish duchy in the 12th century – legally part of Denmark, but in many ways autonomous. Denmark repeatedly tried to fully reintegrate the Duchy of Schleswig into the Danish kingdom. Holstein, just on the other side of the Danish border from Schleswig, was in the Middle Ages a fief of the Holy Roman Empire. From 1460 on, the two had been ruled together by a common Duke, who in practice was also the King of Denmark. The Treaty of Ribe, agreed to by the Danish King in order to gain control of both states, seemed to indicate that Schleswig and Holstein were to remain united, though that interpretation was later challenged.

The Holy Roman Empire was dissolved in 1806. The German Confederation, formed in 1815, included Holstein. By the early 19th century, the population of Holstein, as well as that of much of Southern Schleswig, was almost entirely ethnically German.

Both Schleswig and Holstein had been ruled through institutions separate from the rest of the Kingdom of Denmark. On 27 March 1848, King Frederik VII of Denmark announced to the people of Schleswig the promulgation of a liberal constitution under which the duchy, while preserving its local autonomy, would become an integral part of Denmark. This led to an open uprising by the German majority in both Schleswig and Holstein in support of independence from Denmark and of close association with the German Confederation. The military intervention of the Kingdom of Prussia supported the uprising: the Prussian army drove Denmark's troops from Schleswig and Holstein, beginning the First Schleswig War (1848–1851), which ended in a Danish victory at Idstedt; with the London Protocol, the international community agreed on the duchies' status.

A second crisis emerged due to a succession dispute. The dukedoms of Holstein and Lauenburg were legally inherited under the German Salic Law, which ignored females; differing laws in the Kingdom of Denmark with Schleswig permitted male heirs to inherit through a female line. Under these varying laws, the childless King Frederik VII of Denmark had one legal heir as King of Denmark and duke of Schleswig, and a different heir as Duke of Holstein. But when Frederik died in 1863, his Danish heir, King Christian IX, claimed to have inherited the Duchy of Holstein as well, and attempted to reintegrate the Duchy of Schleswig into the Danish kingdom by signing the November Constitution. This was seen as a violation of the London Protocol, and it led to the Second Schleswig War of 1864 and ultimately to the Duchies' absorption into the German Confederation.

The underlying legal dispute over the duchies was seen as complex and somewhat obscure by contemporaries, as evidenced by a quip attributed to British statesman Lord Palmerston: "Only three people have ever really understood the Schleswig-Holstein business – the Prince Consort, who is dead – a German professor, who has gone mad – and I, who have forgotten all about it." Nevertheless, the Schleswig–Holstein question gave rise to conflicts between major powers for much of the 19th century. Following the defeat of the German Empire in World War I, the Danish-majority area of Northern Schleswig was finally unified with Denmark after two plebiscites organised by the Allied powers. A small minority of ethnic Germans still lives in North Schleswig, while a Danish minority remains in South Schleswig.

== Constitutional problem ==
Since 1849, disparate systems of government had co-existed within the Danish state. Denmark proper had become a constitutional democracy. However, absolutism was still the system of Schleswig and Holstein, with advisory assemblies based on the estates system which gave more power to the most affluent members of society. The three units were governed by one cabinet, consisting of liberal ministers of Denmark who urged economic and social reforms, and conservative ministers from the Holstein nobility who opposed political reform. After the uprising in Holstein and Schleswig, the Danish monarch had no interest in sharing rule with the people, many formerly rebellious. Estates of the realm, with their fear of being replaced by democratic institutions, were easier to be compromised.

This caused a deadlock for practical lawmaking, hardened by ethnic tensions, and a complete inability to govern was imminent. Moreover, Danish opponents of this so-called Unitary State (Helstaten) feared that Holstein's presence in the government and, at the same time, Holstein's membership of the German Confederation would lead to increased German interference with Holstein, or even into purely Danish affairs.

In Copenhagen, the palace and most of the administration supported a strict adherence to the status quo. The same applied to foreign powers such as the United Kingdom, France and Russia, who would not accept a weakened Denmark in favour of a German power, such as Austria or Prussia, acquiring Holstein with the important naval harbour of Kiel or controlling the entrance to the Baltic.

== Language and nationality ==
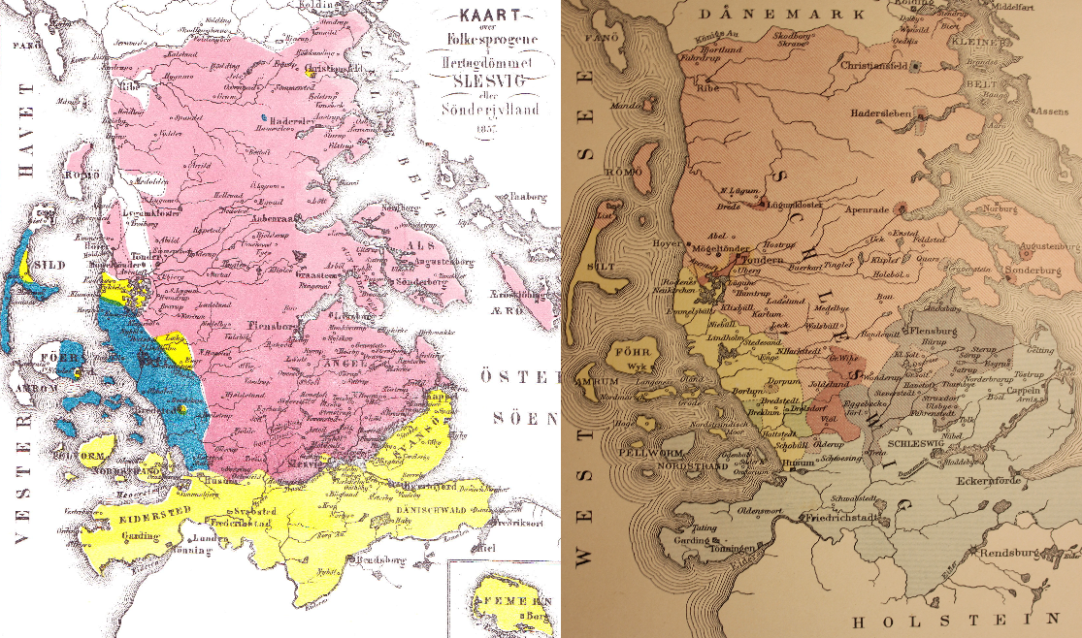
Language shift in the 19th century in Southern Schleswig, showing a Danish and a German language map

There was also the national question: both Germany and Denmark wished, characteristically of the nineteenth century, to create and consolidate nationalities from a background of fragmented cultural practices and dialects.

Lastly, there was the international question: the rival ambitions of the German powers involved, and beyond them the interests of other European states, notably that of the United Kingdom in preventing the rise of a German sea-power in the north.

German had been the language of government in Schleswig and Holstein, while the Danish king and partly the Gottorf dukes ruled, and had been a language of government of the kingdom of Denmark in several eras. Since the Lutheran Reformation, German had been dominant in church and schools in the southern parts of Schleswig, and Danish was the dominant language among the peasantry in Schleswig.

Low German was the language of all of Holstein. During the centuries following the Middle Ages, Low German had come to dominate in Southern Schleswig, which had originally been predominantly Danish-speaking. The Danish language still dominated in Northern Schleswig. Around 1800, German and Danish were spoken in approximately equal proportions throughout what is now Central Schleswig.

The Low German language had been slowly spreading at the expense of Danish in previous centuries: for example, Danish was still spoken on the peninsula of Schwansen around 1780 (the last known use of Danish was in the villages near the Schlei), but then became extinct.

The language border in the nineteenth century conformed approximately to the current border between Denmark and Germany.

It was clear that Danish dominance in Schleswig was vulnerable and weakening. Through its vigorous economic activity, the ethnically German area to the south expanded its geographic domain. Linguistically Low German immigrants constantly arrived, and previously Danish-speaking families often came to find it convenient to change languages. The Low German language, rather than Danish, had become typical of Holstein and much of south Schleswig.

One solution, which afterwards had the support of Napoleon III, would have been to partition Schleswig on the lines of nationality, assigning the Danish part to Denmark, the German to Holstein. This idea, which afterwards had supporters among both Danes and Germans, proved impracticable at the time owing to the intractable disposition of the majority on both sides. This solution was subsequently implemented by plebiscites in 1920 as a condition of the Treaty of Versailles, and Northern Schleswig was returned to Denmark.

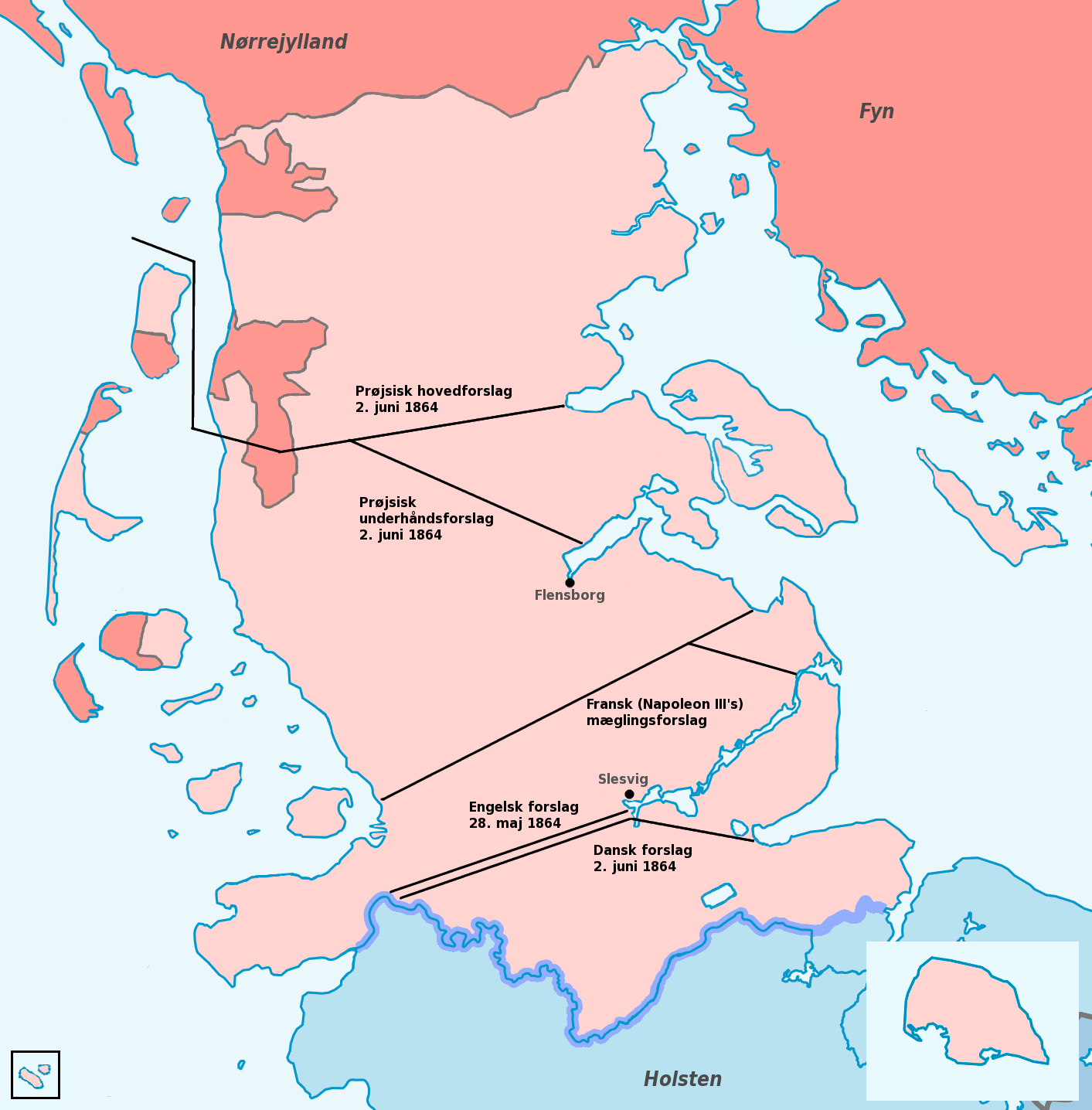
Schleswig / Slesvig Partition Plans 1864

== Treaty of Ribe ==
German Schleswig-Holsteiners often cited a clause from the Treaty of Ribe of 1460, stating that Schleswig and Holstein should "always be together and never partitioned (or separated)". Although this treaty played a minor role at the more formal level of the conflict, its proclamation "Forever Inseparable" (Up ewig ungedeelt) obtained proverbial status during the German nationalist awakening, both among those wishing an independent Schleswig-Holstein, and in the German unification movement in general.

In Denmark it was granted less significance, and the citing widely regarded to be out of context, as it could either hint at the duchies not being separated from each other, or their not being partitioned into smaller shares of inheritance. This had happened many times anyway, leaving a confusing pattern of feudal units. Danes also brought forward rulings of a Danish clerical court and a German Emperor, of 1424 and 1421 respectively, stating that Schleswig rightfully belonged to Denmark, because it was a Danish fief and Holstein was a fief of the Holy Roman Empire, wanting Schleswig and Holstein to separate from each other.

The major powers appear to have given the Treaty of Ribe little notice in comparison to the ethnic conflict and worries about the European balance of power.

== Resolution ==
The Province of Schleswig–Holstein (red), within the Kingdom of Prussia, within the German Empire, 1866–1918

The Second Schleswig War resolved the Schleswig–Holstein Question violently, by forcing King Christian IX of Denmark to renounce (on 1 August 1864) all his rights in the duchies in favour of Kaiser Franz Joseph I of Austria and King Wilhelm I of Prussia. By Article XIX of the definitive Treaty of Vienna signed on 30 October 1864, a period of six years was allowed during which the inhabitants of the duchies might opt for Danish nationality and transfer themselves and their goods to Denmark; and the rights pertaining to birth in the provinces were guaranteed to all, whether in the kingdom or the duchies, who had been entitled to those rights at the time of the exchange of ratifications of the treaty.

In the Austro–Prussian War of 1866, Prussia took Holstein from Austria and the two duchies subsequently merged into the Province of Schleswig-Holstein. From this point on, the Schleswig–Holstein question was subsumed by the larger issue of Austro-Prussian relations, which the 1866 war deeply influenced. It survived, however, as between Danes and Germans, though narrowed to the question of the fate of the Danish population of Schleswig. This question is of great interest to students of international law and as illustrating the practical problems involved in asserting the modern principle of nationality.

For the effect on the Danes of Schleswig and events afterwards, see History of Schleswig-Holstein.

Following the defeat of the German Empire in the First World War, the Allied powers organised two plebiscites in Northern and Central Schleswig on 10 February and 14 March 1920, respectively. In Northern Schleswig, 75% voted for reunification with Denmark and 25% for remaining in Germany. It became South Jutland County in Denmark, now part of the Region of Southern Denmark. In Central Schleswig, the situation was reversed with 80% voting for Germany and 20% for Denmark. No vote ever took place in the southern third of Schleswig or in Holstein, as the result was considered a foregone conclusion. Today, they form the German state of Schleswig-Holstein.

== Literature ==
Elements of the Schleswig–Holstein question were fictionalised in Royal Flash, the second of George MacDonald Fraser's The Flashman Papers novels.

Its potential solution (or lack thereof) also forms part of the solution to the mystery at the centre of Kim Newman's short story "Tomorrow Town".

Danish author Herman Bang wrote of life on the island of Als in the aftermath of the Battle of Dybbøl in the Second War of Schleswig in his novel Tine, published in 1889.

Dostoevsky refers to this as "The farce in Schleswig–Holstein" in Notes from Underground.

The question appears in the first volume of the Reminiscences of Carl Schurz as an issue of concern in the Revolutions of 1848, and also as the farcical recollections of his friend Adolf Strodtmann regarding Strodtmann's participation in the conflict (see Chapter 5, pp. 130–132, and Chapter 6, pp. 141–143).

Terry Pratchett parodied it in several Discworld books as "The Muntab Question" ("Where's Muntab?" "That, indeed, is the question.")

== See also ==
- History of Schleswig-Holstein
