= Region Sønderjylland–Schleswig =

Danish–German cooperation region

Region Sønderjylland–Schleswig is the regional centre for cross-border cooperation between the municipalities of Tønder, Aabenraa, Haderslev and Sønderborg, the regional council of southern Denmark, the districts Schleswig-Flensburg and Nordfriesland, and the independent city of Flensburg.

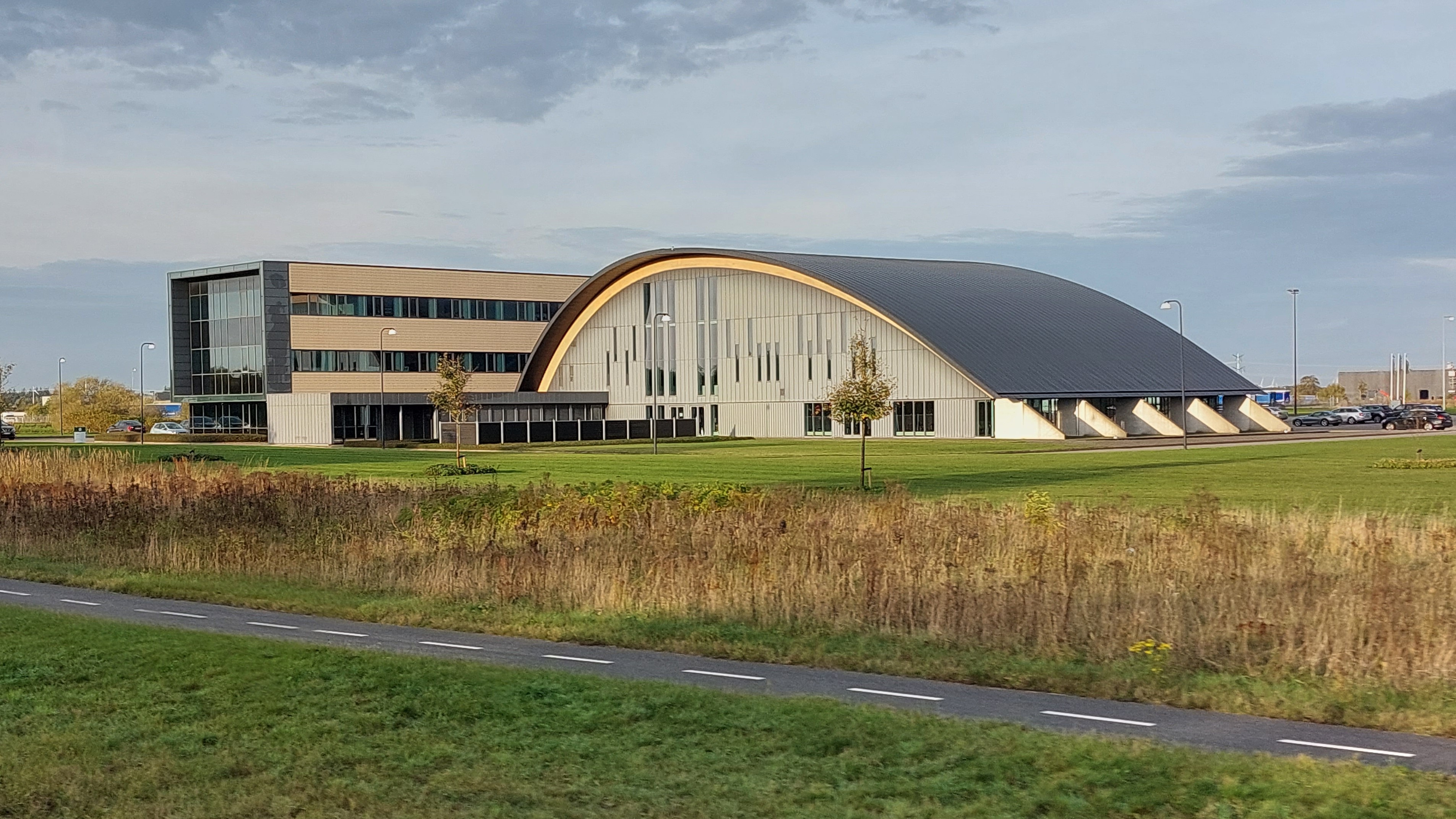
Region Sønderjylland–Schleswig's FDE building, 2022

Region Sønderjylland–Schleswig was established on 16 September 1997 in Aabenraa. It is a recognized Euroregion, a legislative cooperation between two or more European regions sharing a common border. All Euroregions are organised in the Association of European Border Regions with its head domicile in Gronau. The coordinating centre for the cross border cooperation within Region Sønderjylland–Schleswig is fulfilled by the Regional Office in Padborg.

== Name ==
Region Sønderjylland–Schleswig refers to the historical background of the cross-border cooperation. Both Schleswig and Sønderjylland have become two independent institutions which characterized the old Duchy of Schleswig which was divided in 1920 between Denmark and Germany. The southeastern part of Region Sønderjylland–Schleswig, which is in the German district of Rendsburg-Eckernförde, declined to become part of the cross-border cooperation.

== Partners ==
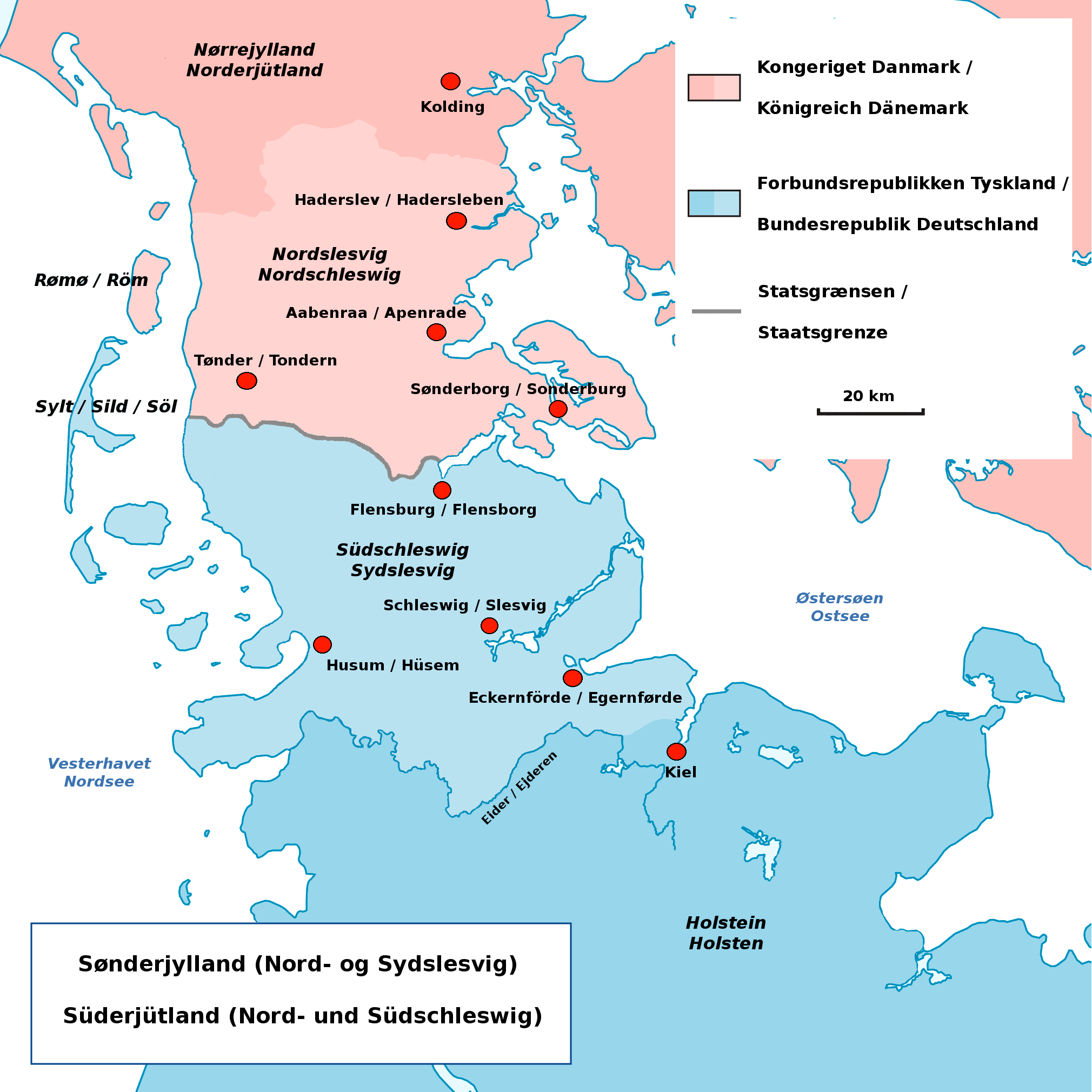
Map over Sønderjylland-Schleswig, but note, that the southeast area around Eckernförde does not participate in the Euroregion

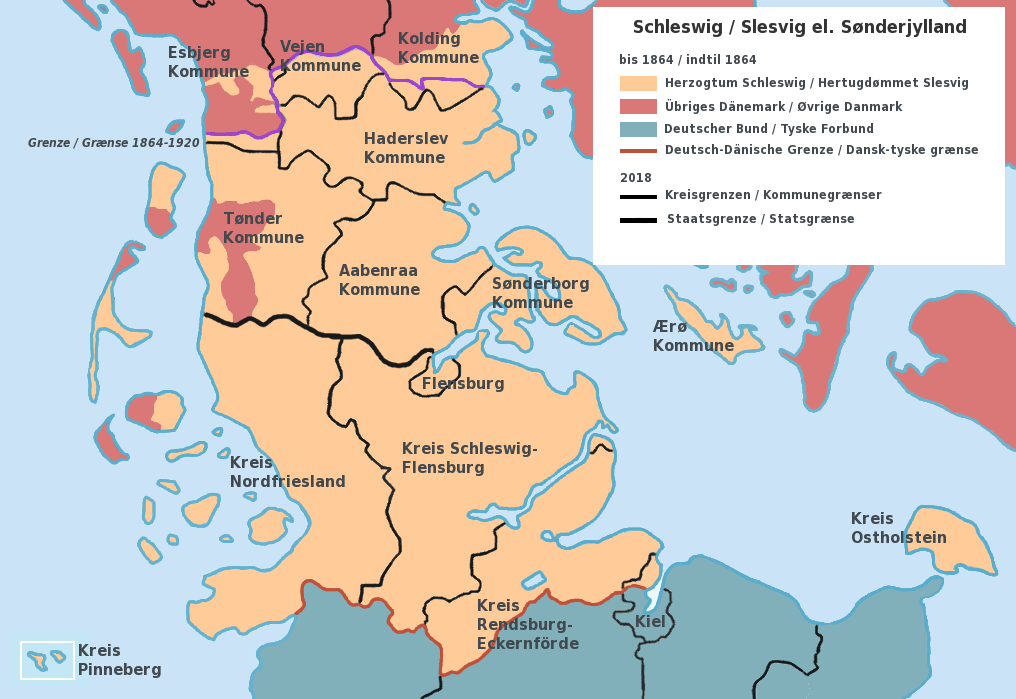
The Duchy of Schleswig and today's administrative borders

=== Danish ===
- Region Syddanmark (Regional Council of Southern Denmark)
- Haderslev Kommune (Haderslev Local Authority)
- Aabenraa Kommune (Aabenraa Local Authority)
- Tønder Kommune (Tønder Local Authority)
- Sønderborg Kommune (Sønderborg Local Authority)

=== German ===
- Kreis Schleswig-Flensburg (Schleswig-Flensburg Local Authority)
- Kreis Nordfriesland (North Friesland Local Authority)
- Stadt Flensburg (Municipality of Flensburg)

== Laws and regulations ==
The co-operating partners of Region Sønderjylland–Schleswig are still subject to their own national legislation. At the same time, the co-operation supports the European Charter for Border Regions and Cross-border regions that was implemented by the Association of European Border Regions in 1995. The foundation for the co-operation is based on equal rights and a mutual respect for the other side's cultural identity, and decisions are made in unanimity. The Region's administrative domicile is located where the partners decide to place the secretariat of the organization.

== Objectives ==
There are several different objectives for cross-border cooperation.

First of all, a wish for a broader demographic contact and cultural exchange between the two populations, which in turn should lead to a deeper mutual understanding and an increased knowledge of each culture and language in the longer term. In order to support this objective, Region Sønderjylland–Schleswig provides administrative and financial support for cultural projects. For example, through the Interreg project “KursKultur 2.0”, the exchange of teachers, cross-border school cooperation and various language projects are prioritized.

There is also great focus on economic integration and interaction of the cross-border labour market. Since 2004 the Infocenter, under Region Sønderjylland–Schleswig, has provided advice and counselling for cross-border commuters. The centre started as an Interreg project but became so popular, that it was permanently established in 2007. The Infocenter provides free advice and counselling both to the business community, local government and private individuals, wanting to expand job or living opportunities on the other side of the border. Here there is close cooperation with various other networks, for example trade unions, employment agencies, local authorities and clubs.

An internet page, Pendlerinfo, administered by the Regional Office, offers information and help for commuters. Infocenter regularly hold lectures in conjunction with both Danish and German employment agencies and unemployment insurance representatives, in-service training of employees in the councils dealing with cross-border commuting, and gives personal counselling.

Region Sønderjylland–Schleswig is also active in voicing concerns specific to the border region. Region Sønderjylland–Schleswig has for example pointed out the need for mutual recognition of business education. Building projects of current interest like the Fehmarn Belt Bridge and general infrastructure within the border region also has the attention of Region Sønderjylland–Schleswig. In order to support the cross-border business community there have also been some actual projects like the development of Danish-German parking discs and a pocket dictionary.

== Organization ==
The organization consists of:

- Board
- Committees and business groups
- Regional Office as secretary

The board consists of representatives of the local administrative bodies. The responsibilities are many: the board prepares and carries out decisions and works closely together with the Regional Office. Furthermore, the board can appoint business groups for special assignments. Last but not least, the board represents Region Sønderjylland–Schleswig interests in any public debate. Decisions are based on a majority of votes but unity is always the goal.

The Region Sønderjylland–Schleswig has three committees: The Committee for Culture, The Committee for Labor Market and the committee for cross-border Development.

Furthermore, several business interest groups have been established.

The Regional Office in Padborg is the coordinating centre for all Region Sønderjylland–Schleswig's activities. Political cooperation is coordinated and initiatives from any political side are closely monitored. One current example is the initiative to improve the exchange of language teachers. The teaching of Danish in Germany is especially affected by this, because Danish-German exchange of teachers, which should be taken for granted, is difficult due to administrative differences in in-service training.

== Finances ==
The expenses of the organization are set at 50% for each the Danish and the German partners, excluding any grants from any side. All partners have full access to all financial information of the organization. The budget for 2020 is about 735.000 EUR.
