= Karl Ahrens =

German Politician (SPD)

- Ahrens in 1985
- Born: 13 March 1924
- Died: 6 March 2015 (aged 90)
- Occupation: politician

Karl Ahrens (13 March 1924 – 6 March 2015) was a German Social Democratic Party politician who served as member of the German Bundestag from 1969 to 1990. He had a doctorate in law and was an assistant secretary of the Lower-Saxon ministry of the interior. As a member of the Bundestag, he worked mainly in the committee on economic affairs. Ahrens was president of the Association of European Border Regions from 1984 to 1996. He served as president of the Parliamentary Assembly of the Council of Europe from 1983 to 1986 and was the first German to do so.
