= Association of European Border Regions =

European regional organization

The Association of European Border Regions (AEBR) is an organization of European regions and deals with cross-border cooperation in Europe and other continents. AEBR's main office is based in Gronau (North Rhine-Westphalia), Germany. It also has a Project's Office in Berlin, an Antenna in Brussels (at the Office of Extremadura) and Info Centres for Ukraine in Kharkiv (in collaboration with the Simon Kuznets National University of Economics) and for the Balkans in Novi Sad (in collaboration with CESCI Balkans). It represents the interests of the European border and cross-border regions at European, national and regional levels.

== History ==
The first initiative to create a "union for border regions" was discussed in 1965 at the International Regional Planning Conference in Basel. After extensive preparation, ten border regions from Europe came together on June 17–18, 1971, and created a Standing Conference of European Border Regions that later was called "Association of European Border Regions". They elected Alfred Mozer as the first president at AEBR.

President	Inauguration	End of Term
Alfred Mozer (1905–1979)	1971	1975
Horst Gerlach (1919–1990)	1975	1979
Dr Wolfgang Schäuble (born 1942)	1979	1983
Dr Karl Ahrens (born 1924)	1984	1996
Joan M. Vallvé (born 1940)	1996	2004
Lambert van Nistelrooij (born 1953)	2004	2009
Karl-Heinz Lambertz (born 1952)	2009	2017
Oliver Paasch	2017	2019
Ann-Sofi Backgren	2019	2020
Karl-Heinz Lambertz (born 1952)	2020	current president

== Objectives ==
AEBR supports European border and cross-border regions in order to:

- make their particular problems, opportunities, tasks and projects intelligible
- represent their overall interests towards national and international parliaments, other authorities and institutions
- initiate, support and coordinate their co-operation throughout Europe
- exchange experiences and information to formulate and coordinate common interests from the various problems and opportunities of border regions, and to offer solutions.
- promote CBC structures, projects and programs
- assist in the preparation of CBC events and other activities.

In order to reach their objectives, AEBR works together at European level with:

- European Union
  - European Parliament
  - European Commission
  - Committee of the Regions
  - European Economic and Social Committee
- Council of Europe
  - Parliamentary Assembly
  - Congress of the Council of Europe
  - Committee of Experts on border issues

== Organization ==
=== General Assembly ===
The General Assembly votes for the President and the Executive Committee and decides which applicants are accepted into the organization, as well as to determine contribution fees.

=== The Executive Committee ===
The Executive Committee consists of the President, Treasurer and at least seven Vice-Presidents and twenty members representing border and cross-border regions who receive a two-year term once voted into office. They are responsible for positions adopted by the AEBR on vital issues and cooperating with European and national institutions, organizations and associations. They are also responsible for appointing the Secretary General. The President (highest ranking representative of AEBR) represents AEBR externally and also is responsible to make joint decisions with the Secretary General. The Secretary General has the power and also authority to represent AEBR.

=== Subsidiary Bodies ===
The Association of European Border Regions may open forums, form committees and employ representatives from European and other political bodies, associations and social groups that receive an advisory capacity. AEBR also organizes task forces and working groups on different issues of interest for European border and cross-border regions to which belong representatives of European institutions and political committees, associations and society-relevant groups with an advisory role. The "Advisory Committee for cross-border cooperation", is composed of scientists and stakeholders that advise AEBR in all matters relating to cross-border cooperation. This committee may also make proposals for solving issues in the area of cross-border cooperation.

== Members ==
AEBR formed about 100 border and cross-border regions, representing over 200 border regions within and outside the EU. Cross-border regions (e.g. Euregio) and larger combinations (for example Greater Region Saar-Lor-Lux) often have multiple regions as members.

=== Full members ===
A cross-border region, border or associations of border regions within the European Union can apply as a full member with full voting rights.

=== Non-voting members ===
Members without voting rights who can apply as members without voting rights are border and cross-border regions. When accepted as a non-voting member, they receive observer status for two years until their representative status has been conclusively confirmed. Advisory members can also be non-voting members, who can be individuals, associations, institutions and institutes working in the area of cross-border cooperation.

=== Languages ===
The languages primarily used at AEBR as working languages are German, English, French, Polish, Spanish, Italian, Portuguese, Russian and, if need be, other languages of member regions.

== Projects ==
- INTERREG IIIC RFO Project “Change on Borders” (2003-2007)
- Study on “Legal instrument for decentralised cooperation” for the European Commission (2003-2004)
- ULYSSES-project within the ESPON Programme (2009-2012)
- GRUNDTVIG-project SCULTBORD (Spreading Culture on Border Regions) (2010-2012)
- EU-project: Improving information for cross-border workers in European border regions (2012)
- EU-projects: CBC in Latin America (2010; 2012, 2013)
  - Cross-Border Cooperation in Latin America. Contribution to the Regional Integration Process:
  - Cross-border co-operation in Latin America: support to integrated and sustainable development and cross-border co-operation in the Paraná axis development
- EU-projects: CBC in Western Africa
  - Opportunities for Cross Border cooperation in West Africa: a contribution to the regional integration process
- Interreg Volunteer Youth (IVY) (2017-2020)
- b-solutions (2017-2021)

== Publications ==
- Reviewed Maps “Cross-border Cooperation Areas” (2007 and 2011)
- Newsletter of AEBR (2004-2009)
- Cooperation between European Border Regions. Review and Perspectives (2007)
- Electronic Newsflash of AEBR (since 2009)
- Discussion papers, opinions and proposals dealing with territorial approach, cohesion policy, transport, health, rural, mountainous and maritime areas, external borders etc.
