= Adsbøl Church =

Coordinates: 54°56′13″N 9°37′14″E

- Adsbøl Kirke
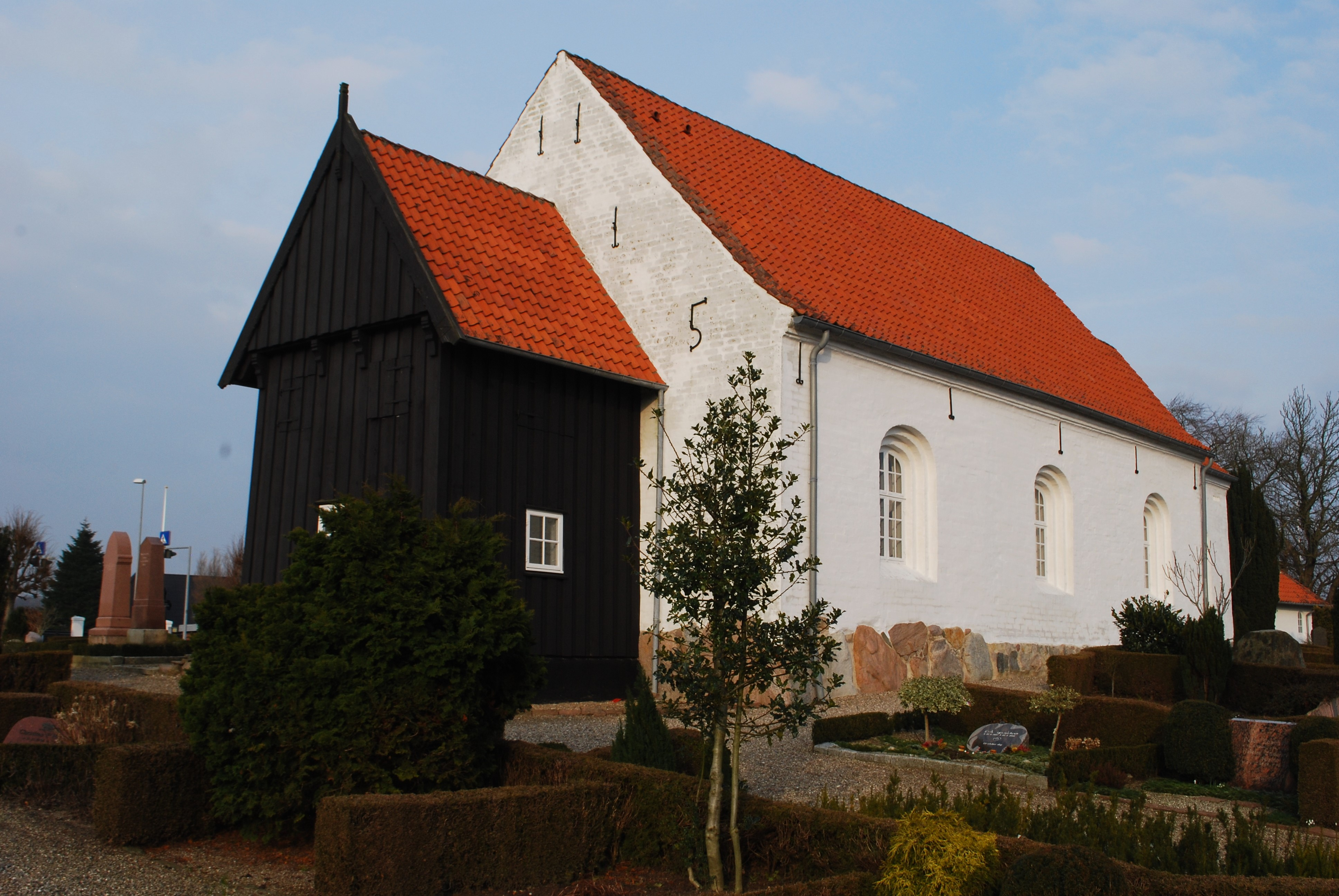
- Adsbøl Church
- Location: Adsbøl
- Country: Denmark
- Denomination: Church of Denmark

Administration
- Diocese: Haderslev
- Parish: Adsbøl

Adsbøl church (Danish: Adsbøl Kirke) is a 13th-century building in Adsbøl, Denmark.

== Gallery ==
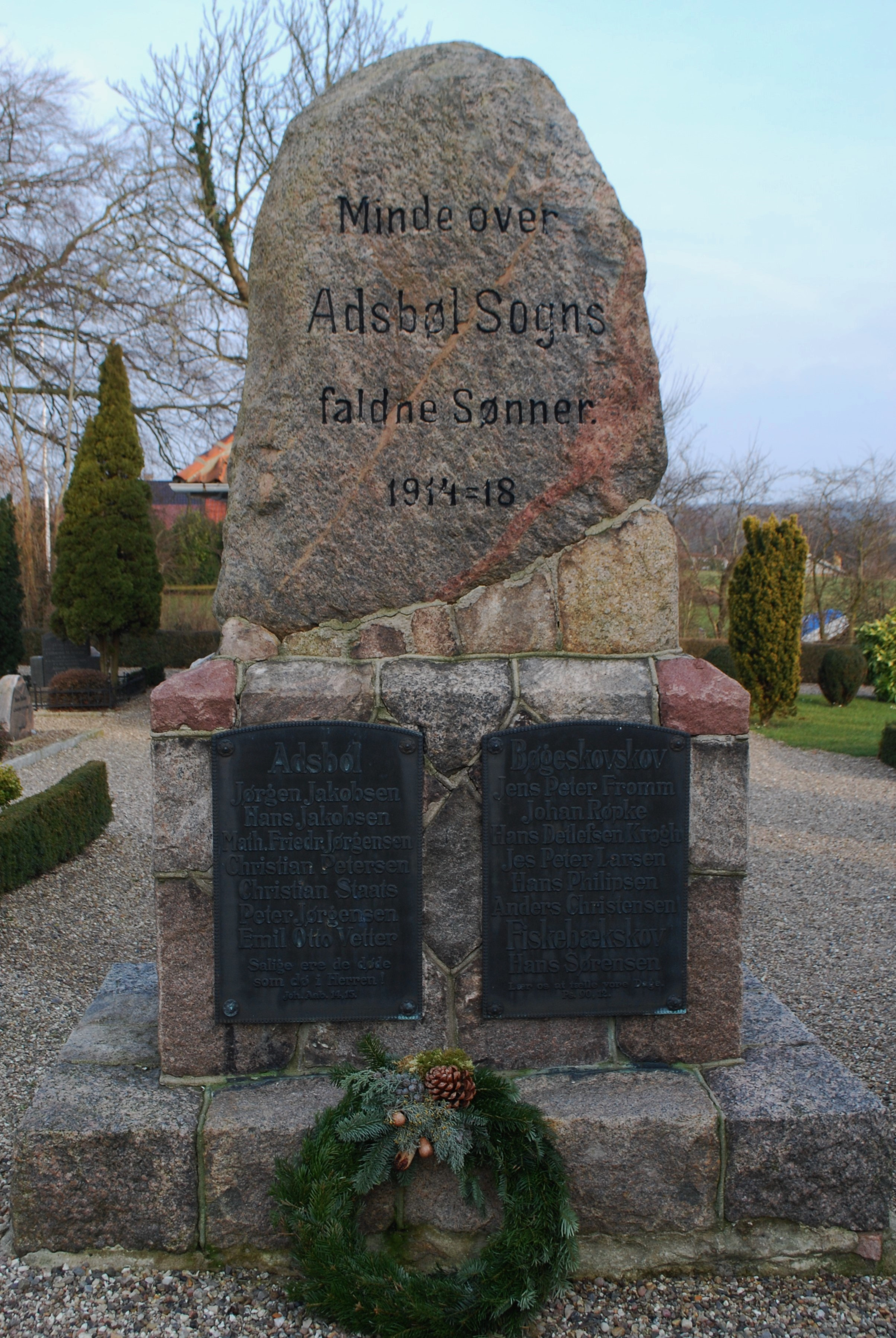
The memorial stone for the parish's fallen in World War I
