= Southern Schleswig =

Southern half of the former Duchy of Schleswig in Germany

Coordinates: 54°44′N 9°05′E

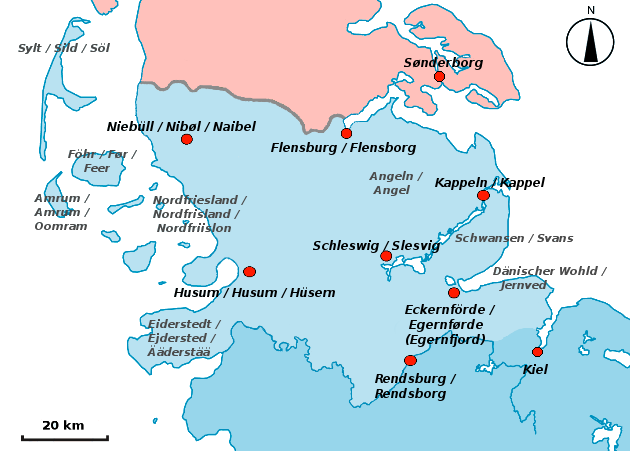
Southern Schleswig (with German, Danish and North Frisian place names)

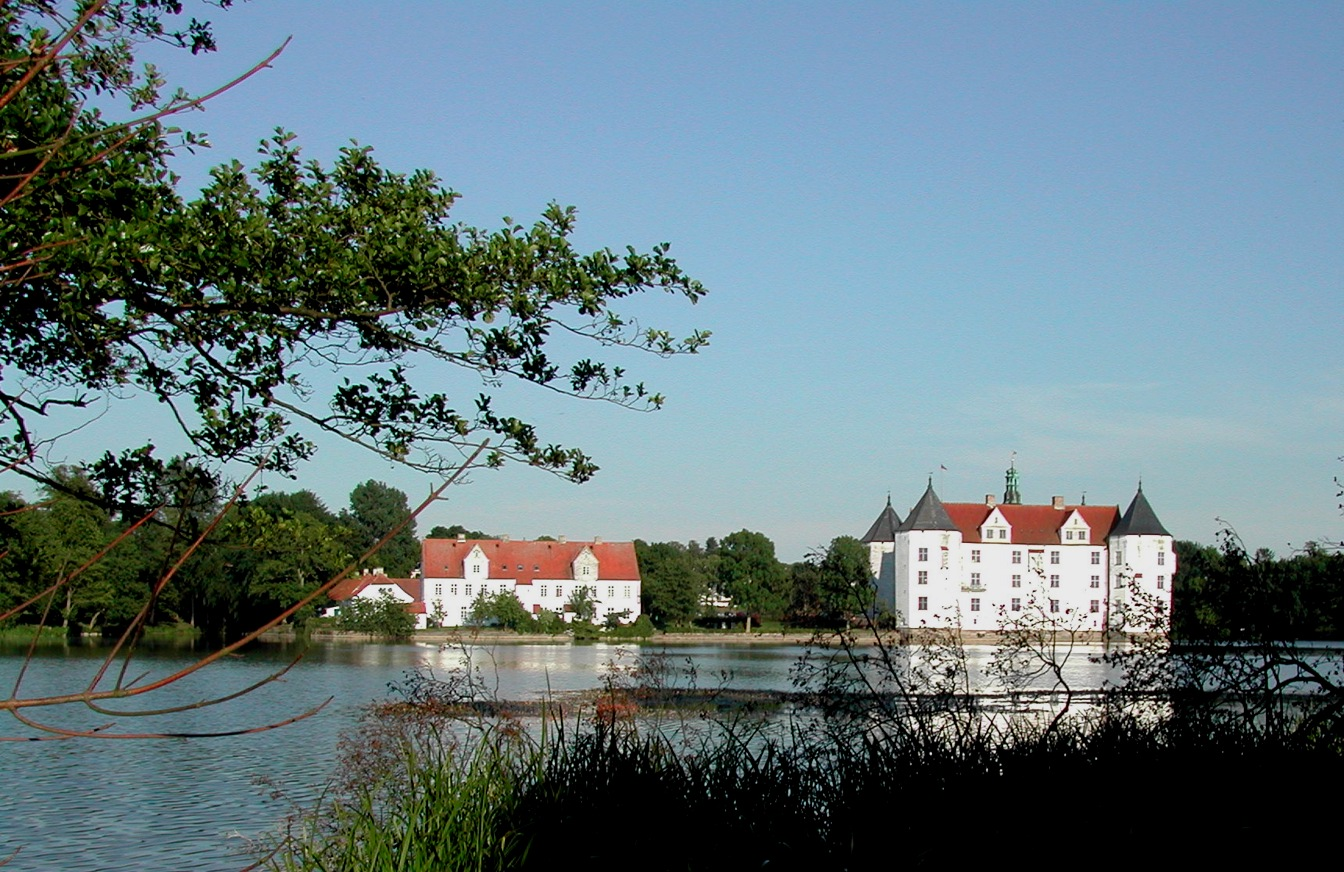
Residence of the Danish kings at Glücksburg Castle

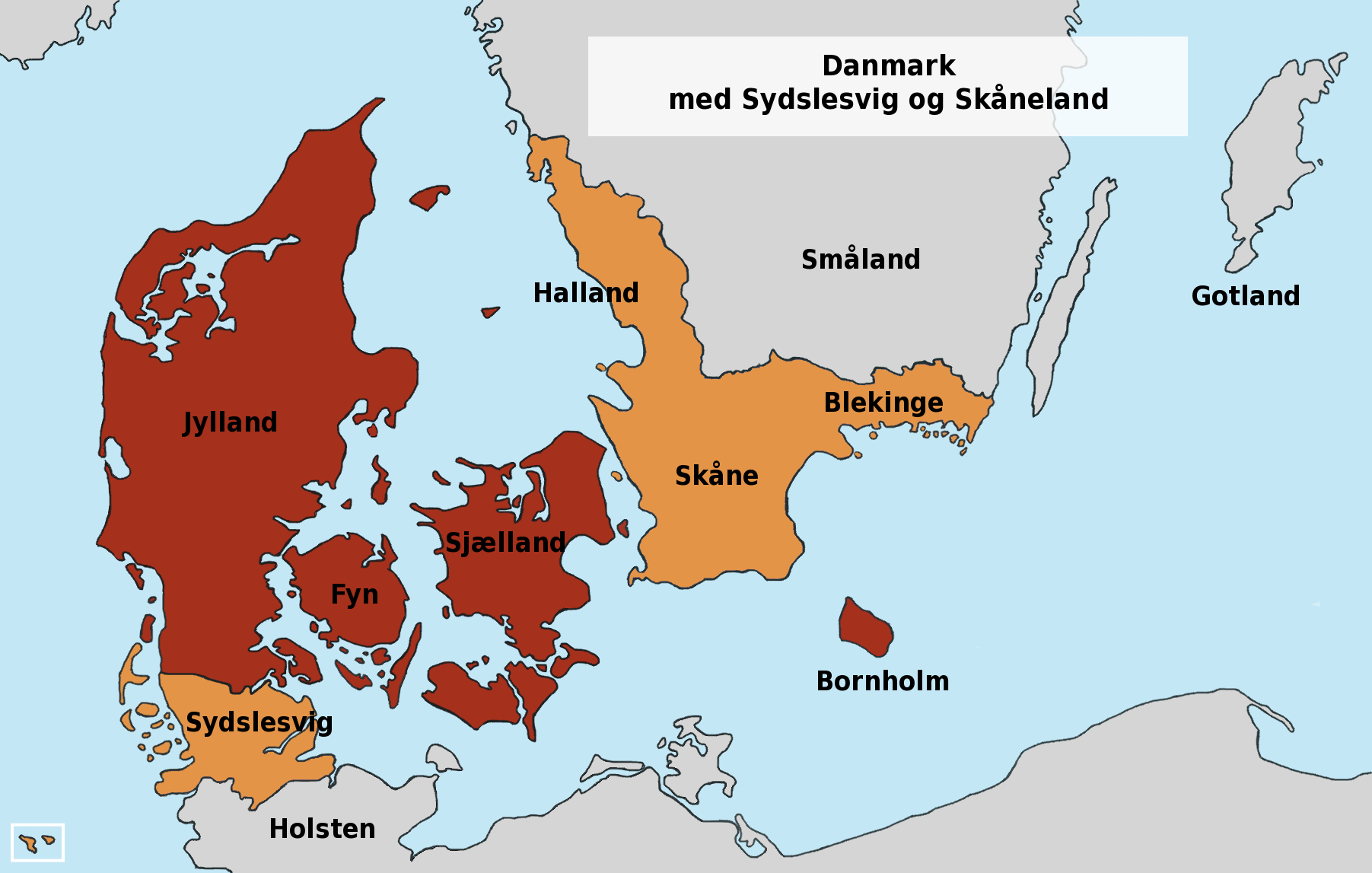
Today's Denmark and the former Danish provinces Southern Schleswig, Skåne, Halland and Blekinge.

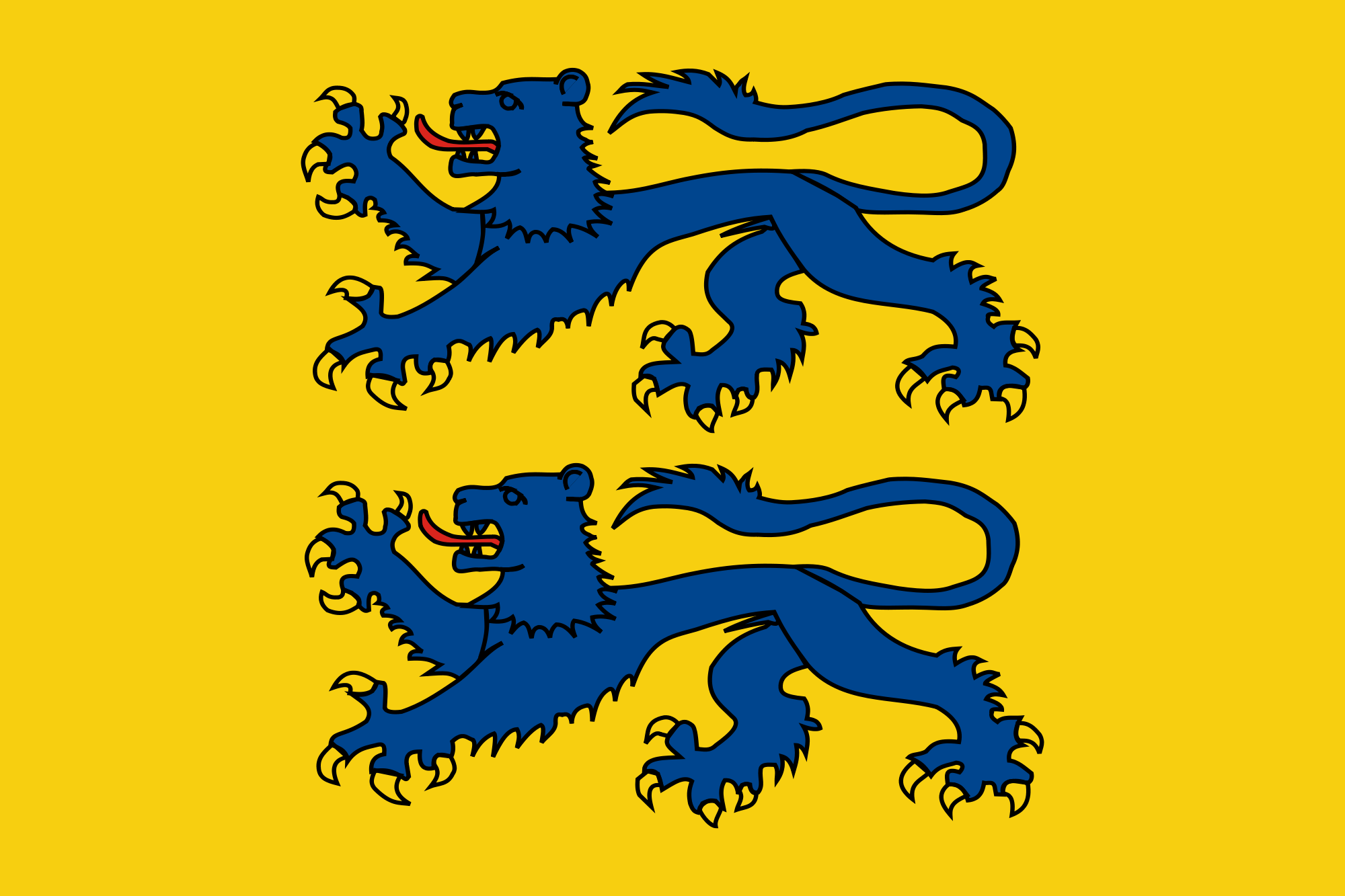
The Schleswig Lions as heraldic emblem of Schleswig / Sønderjylland

Southern Schleswig (German: Südschleswig or Landesteil Schleswig, Danish: Sydslesvig; North Frisian: Söödslaswik) is the southern half of the former Duchy of Schleswig in Germany on the Jutland Peninsula. The geographical area today covers the large area between the Eider river in the south and the Flensburg Fjord in the north, where it borders Denmark. Northern Schleswig, congruent with the former South Jutland County, forms the southernmost part of Denmark. The area belonged to the Crown of Denmark until Prussia and Austria declared war on Denmark in 1864. Denmark wanted to give away the German-speaking Holsten and set the new border at the small river Ejderen. Prussian chancellor Otto von Bismarck concluded that this justified a war, and even proclaimed it a "holy war". He also turned to the Emperor of Austria, Franz Joseph I of Austria for help. A similar war in 1848 had gone poorly for the Prussians. With Prussia's modern weapons and the help from both the Austrians and General Moltke, the Danish army was destroyed and forced to make a disorderly retreat. The Prussian-Danish border was then moved from the Elbe up in Jutland to the Kongeåen creek.

After the First World War, two referendums decided a new border. The northern part reverted to Denmark as Nordslesvig (North Slesvig). But the middle and southern part, including Schleswig's only city, Flensburg, remained in Germany. In Denmark, the loss of Flensborg sparked a political crisis, Påskekrisen or the Easter Crisis of 1920. After the Second World War the area remained as German territory and, with Holstein, formed the new state of Schleswig-Holstein as a part of the Federal Republic of Germany (West Germany) in 1948.

== History ==
The Schleswig lands north of the Eider river and the Bay of Kiel had been a fief of the Danish Crown since the Early Middle Ages. The southern Holstein region belonged to Francia and later to the Holy Roman Empire, but it was held as an imperial fief by the Danish kings since the 1460 Treaty of Ribe.

The Schleswig-Holstein Question was first brought to a head during the Revolutions of 1848, when, from 1848 to 1851, revolting German-speaking National liberals backed by Prussia fought for the separation of Schleswig and Holstein from Denmark in the First Schleswig War. Though the status quo ante bellum was restored, the conflict lingered on, and on 1 February 1864 Prussian and Austrian troops crossed the Eider, sparking off the Second Schleswig War, after which Denmark had to cede Schleswig and Holstein according to the Treaty of Vienna. After the Austro-Prussian War of 1866, victorious Prussia took control over all Schleswig and Holstein but was obliged by the Peace of Prague to hold a referendum in predominantly Danish-speaking Northern Schleswig, which it never did.

After the German defeat in World War I, the Schleswig Plebiscites were decreed by the 1919 Treaty of Versailles, in which the present-day German-Danish border was drawn. The border took effect on 15 June 1920, dividing Schleswig into a southern and northern part and leaving a considerable Danish and German minority on both sides.

== Modern day ==
Southern Schleswig is part of the German state (Bundesland) of Schleswig-Holstein, thus its denotation as Landesteil Schleswig. It does not, however, form an administrative entity, but instead consists of the districts (Landkreise) of Schleswig-Flensburg, Nordfriesland, the urban district (Kreisfreie Stadt) of Flensburg and the northern part of Rendsburg-Eckernförde (former district of Eckernförde plus the historic Hohner Harde).

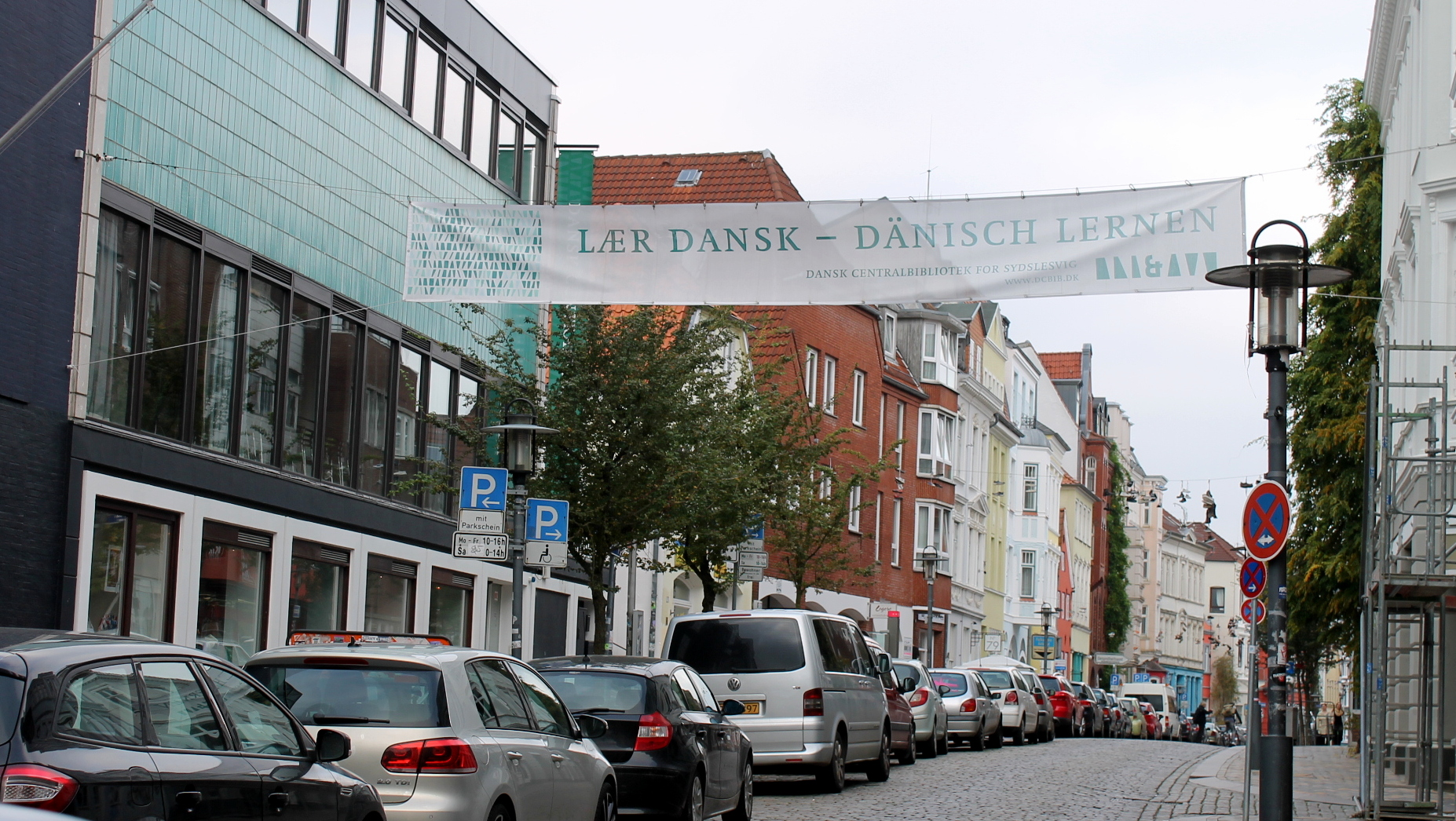
Learn Danish banner in Flensburg, one of the major cities of Southern Schleswig

Besides Standard German, Low Saxon dialects (Schleswigsch) are spoken, as well as Danish (Standard Danish or South Schleswig Danish) and its South Jutlandic variant, plus North Frisian in the west. Danish and North Frisian are official minority languages. Many of the inhabitants who speak only German and not Danish do not consider the region any different from the rest of Schleswig-Holstein. This notion is disputed by those defining themselves as Danes, South Schleswigans or Schleswigans, particularly historians and people organised in the institutions of the Danish minority of Southern Schleswig, such as the South Schleswig Voter Federation, a political party representing the Danish and North Frisian minorities in the Landtag of Schleswig-Holstein and exempted from the 5% electoral threshold. Many of the last names found in the region are very often of Scandinavian or Danish form, with the -sen endings like Petersen.

The major cities of Southern Schleswig are Flensburg, the city of Schleswig, Eckernförde and Husum.

== See also ==
- Danish Royal Enclaves
- Southern Schleswig Danish

== Bibliography ==
- Lars Henningsen: Sydslesvigs danske historie, Flensborg 2013.
- Lars Henningsen: Zwischen Grenzkonflikt und Grenzfrieden, Flensburg 2011 (as pdf document)
- Karen Margrethe Pedersen: Dansk sprog i Sydslesvig: det danske sprogs status inden for det danske mindretal i Sydslesvig, Institut for grænseregionsforskning Aabenraa 2000
