= Schleswig-Holstein speciethaler =

Historical currency of Schleswig-Holstein

The Speciethaler was the currency of Schleswig-Holstein until 1866, located in the border region of present-day Denmark and Germany.

It was divided into 60 Schilling Courant, each of 12 Pfennig. The Speciethaler was equal to the Danish rigsdaler specie.

== Production ==
From 1842, Danish coins were issued denominated in both rigsbank skilling (the subunit of the rigsdaler specie) and schilling courant, for use in both Denmark and Schleswig-Holstein.

These were supplemented in 1850 and 1851 with 1 Dreiling (3 Pfennig), 1 Sechsling (6 Pfennig) and 1 Schilling pieces, Schleswig-Holstein's last coins. The Prussian Vereinsthaler was introduced following Schleswig-Holstein's incorporation into Prussia.
