= Southern Jutland =

Region south of the Kongeå in Jutland, Denmark

Coordinates: 54.855856°N 9.367367°E

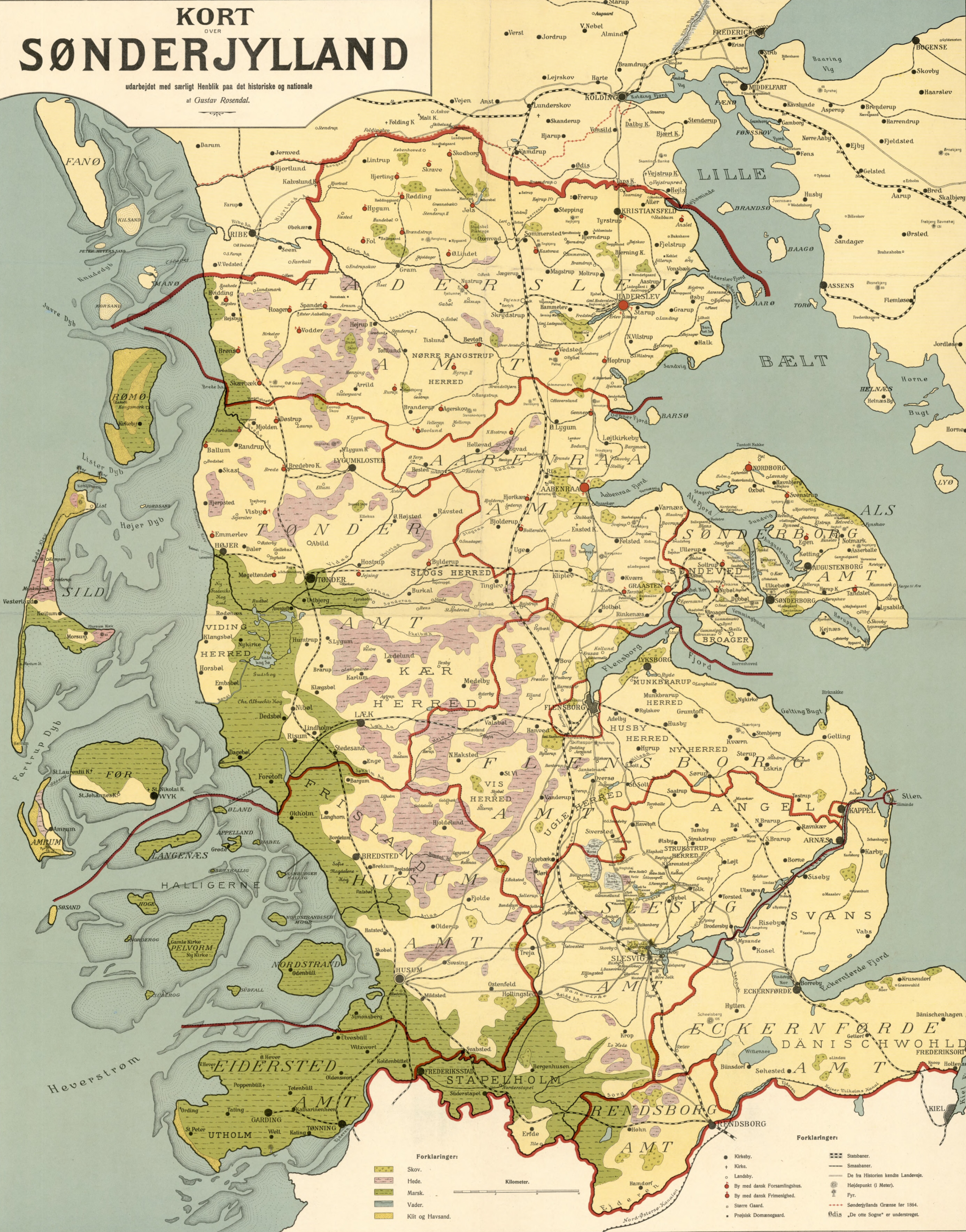
Map of Southern Jutland in 1913

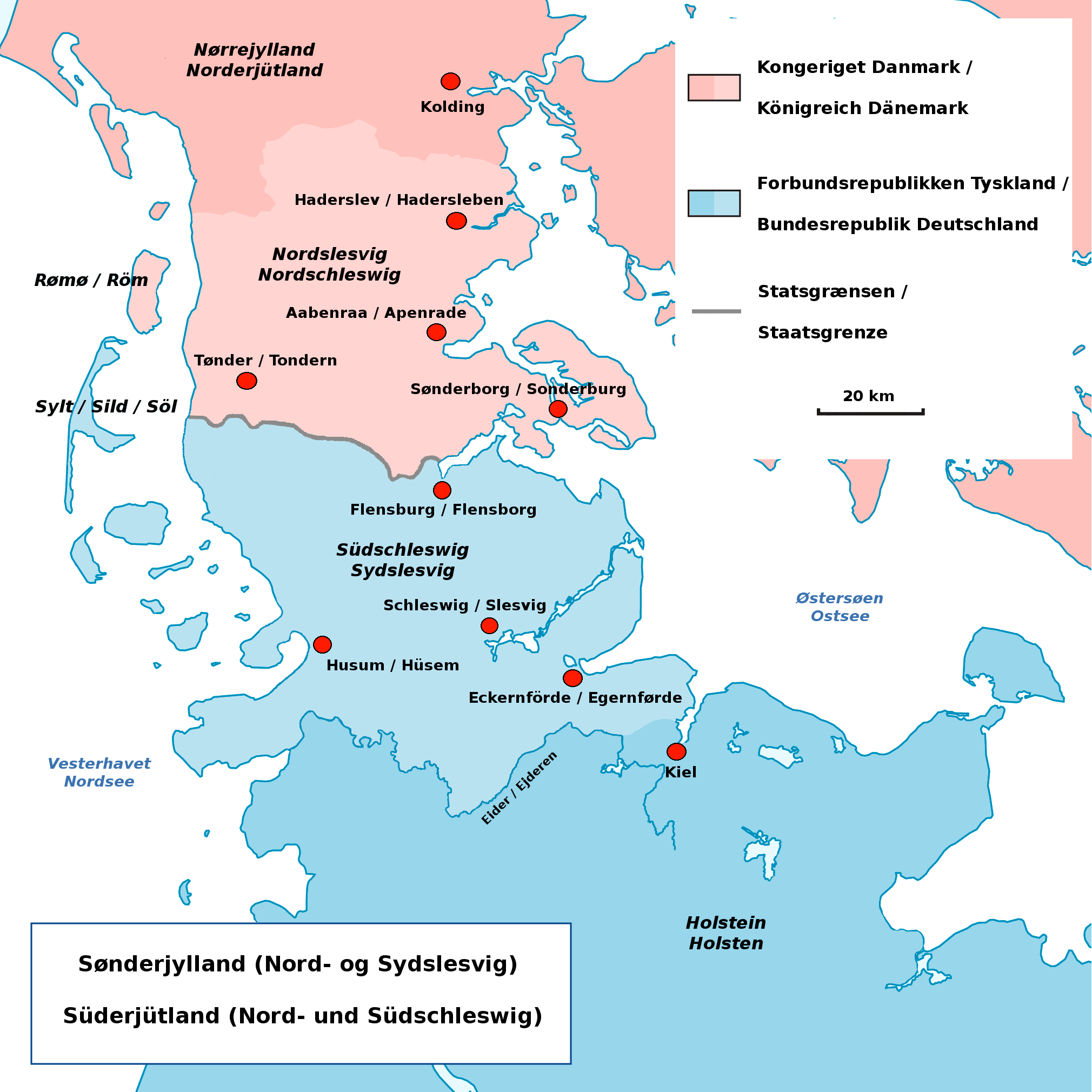
Southern Jutland in the present day

Southern Jutland (Danish: Sønderjylland; North Frisian: Sööd-Jütlönj, German: Südjütland), also known as North Schleswig (Danish: Nordslesvig, North Frisian: Nordslaswik, German: Nordschleswig) is the region south of the Kongeå in Jutland, Denmark and north of the Eider (river) in Schleswig-Holstein, Germany. The region north of the Kongeå is called Nørrejylland, 'Northern Jutland'. Both territories had their own ting assemblies in the Middle Ages (in Viborg and Urnehoved). Southern Jutland is mentioned for the first time in the Knýtlinga saga.

In the 13th century South Jutland became a duchy. The first duke was Canute Lavard (Knud Lavard). In the late 14th century, House Schauenburg orchestrated a political coup led by the German prince Gerhard III. One of his most symbolic actions was renaming the duchy. 'South Jutland' was a distinctly Danish term, linking the region to North Jutland and reinforcing its connection to Danish identity and the Kingdom of Denmark. Gerhard aimed to sever these ties and anchor the duchy more firmly within the German cultural sphere. As a result, the region was renamed the Duchy of Schleswig. The new name derived from the city of Schleswig (Slesvig). Naming duchies after their principal cities was a common German ducal practice, as seen in examples such as the Duchies of Brunswick (Braunschweig), Mecklenburg, Magdeburg, Anhalt, and others. The dukes of Schleswig also became kings of Denmark.

With the demise of the Holy Roman Empire in the 19th century, the term "Sønderjylland" was revived by Denmark and became the subject of a naming dispute between Danes and Germans (the latter continuing the centuries-old "Schleswig") – part of the struggle over possession of the territory itself, resulting in the Schleswig Wars, fought in 1848–1852 and again in 1864. Though Denmark was militarily defeated in the second conflict, pressure from the Great Powers prevented the region being relinquished to the German Confederation.

Denmark failed to capitalize on the situation, opting instead to antagonize the situation — including charging heavy tolls on German shipping through the Danish Straits, pressuring Austria and Prussia into deciding to construct the Kiel Canal to circumvent the expense; which would require sovereignty over Holstein. After the Danish government breached certain political terms laid out in the treaty ending the first conflict, Austro-Prussian forces invaded and swiftly conquered South Jutland from Denmark. Diplomatic efforts, including a personal offer by Christian IX that his whole Kingdom would join the German Confederation if it could remain united with Holstein and Schleswig, failed. Two years later Prussian forces expelled the Austrians from the region altogether and South Jutland was annexed into the German Empire.

The loss of South Jutland is considered to have caused a "national trauma" for Denmark and marked the end of force being viewed as a viable tool of Danish foreign policy. South Jutland became part of the Prussian Province of Schleswig-Holstein. The over 200,000 ethnic Danish inhabitants living in South Jutland were given imperial citizenship and enjoyed and suffered all the rights and responsibilities that came with it. Accordingly, when World War I broke out in 1914, both the German and Danish people of South Jutland were subject to conscription in the German army, Danish protests were ignored. Ultimately more than 30,000 ethnically Danish men served in the German Imperial Army, with thousands dying.

The casualty rate for ethnic Danes fighting in German army were disproportionate and led to decades of ill feelings towards Germany. At Versailles, the Danish government petitioned the allies to hold a plebiscite in South Jutland in accordance with American President Woodrow Wilson's Fourteen Points. This request was granted and following the Schleswig Plebiscites in 1920, South Jutland was divided into Danish Northern and German Southern Schleswig. The Schleswig Plebiscite was the only cession of German territory that was never contested by Hitler and the Nazis.

Northern Schleswig was also known as South Jutland County (1970–2006) and is now part of the Region of Southern Denmark. Southern Schleswig is a part of the German state Schleswig-Holstein. Both parts cooperate today as a Euroregion called Sønderjylland–Schleswig, which covers most of Southern Jutland.

== See also ==
- South Jutland County
