= Danish rigsdaler =

Former currency of Denmark

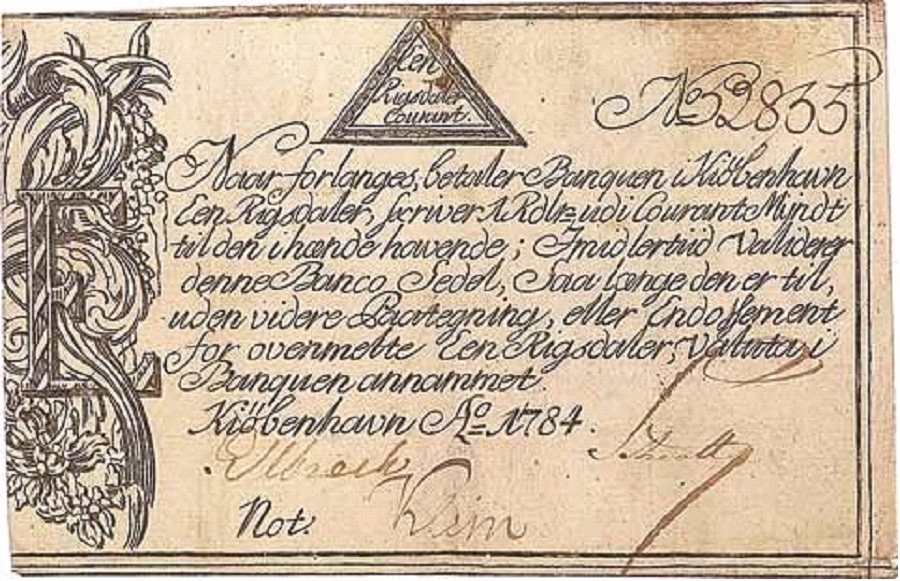
A one-rigsdaler banknote from 1794

The rigsdaler was the name of several currencies used in Denmark until 1875. The similarly named Reichsthaler, riksdaler and rijksdaalder were used in Germany and Austria-Hungary, Sweden and the Netherlands, respectively. These currencies were often anglicized as rix-dollar or rixdollar.

== History ==
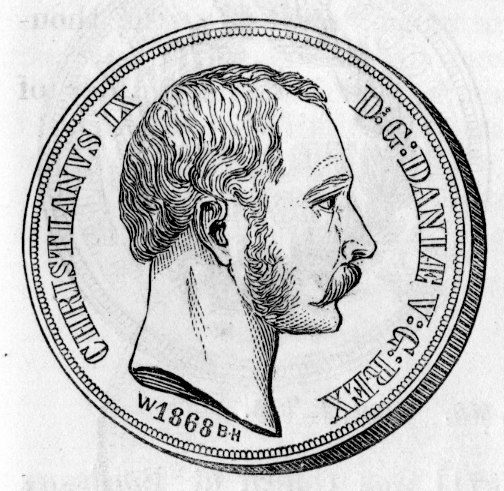
Silver two-rigsdaler coin, with the head of Christian IX, dating from 1868

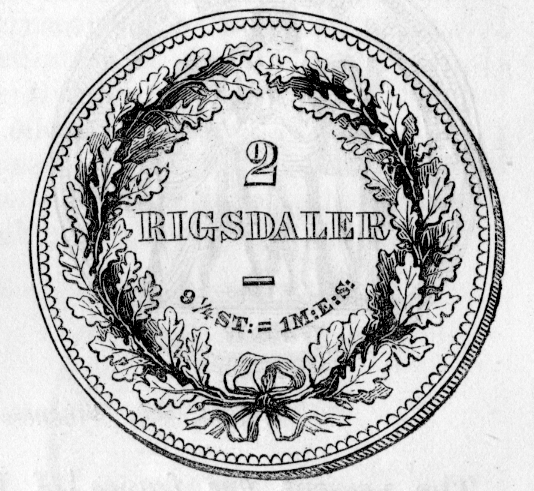
Reverse of the above

Several different currency systems have been used by Denmark from the 16th to 19th centuries. The krone (lit. "crown") first emerged in 1513 as a unit of account worth 8 marks. The more generally used currency system until 1813, however, was the Danish rigsdaler worth 1 1/2 krone (or schlecht daler), 6 marks, or 96 skilling.

The Danish rigsdaler used in the 18th century was a common system shared with the silver reichsthalers of Norway, Hamburg and Schleswig-Holstein. The currency system consisted of the Reichsthaler specie (Rigsdaler specie) worth 120 skillings in Denmark and Norway, and the lower-valued Rigsdaler courant worth 4/5th of specie or 96 skillings (both units worth 60 and 48 schellingen, respectively, in Hamburg and Schleswig-Holstein). In 1770 the Hamburg Bank equated 9 1/4 reichsthalers specie to a Cologne Mark of fine silver, hence 25.28 g silver in a rigsdaler specie.

Following the Danish state bankruptcy of 1813, Denmark dropped out of the currency system above, in favor of a new rigsbankdaler reduced to 1/2 a Rigsdaler specie. The new rigsbankdaler was exchanged for 6 rigsdaler courant in banknotes which were severely devalued during the Napoleonic Wars. 96 skilling made one rigsbankdaler and 192 skilling made one Rigsdaler specie of 25.28 g fine silver.

In 1854 the rigsdaler species name disappeared and the names rigsbankdaler and rigsbank skilling became rigsdaler and skilling rigsmønt. Thus, there were 96 skilling rigsmønt to the rigsdaler.

In 1873, Denmark and Sweden formed the Scandinavian Monetary Union and the rigsdaler was replaced by the Danish krone on 1 January 1875. An equal valued krone/krona of the monetary union replaced the three currencies at the rate of 1 krone/krona = 1/2 Danish rigsdaler = 1/4 Norwegian speciedaler = 1 Swedish riksdaler. Because of this reform, where two Danish kroner was then of equal worth to the Danish daler, the "tokrone" coins got the common name of "daler" as they were functionally the same (the real daler got retired). It, however, became an increasingly-uncommon name since the "tokrone" coin did not exist from 1959 to 1993.

== Coins ==
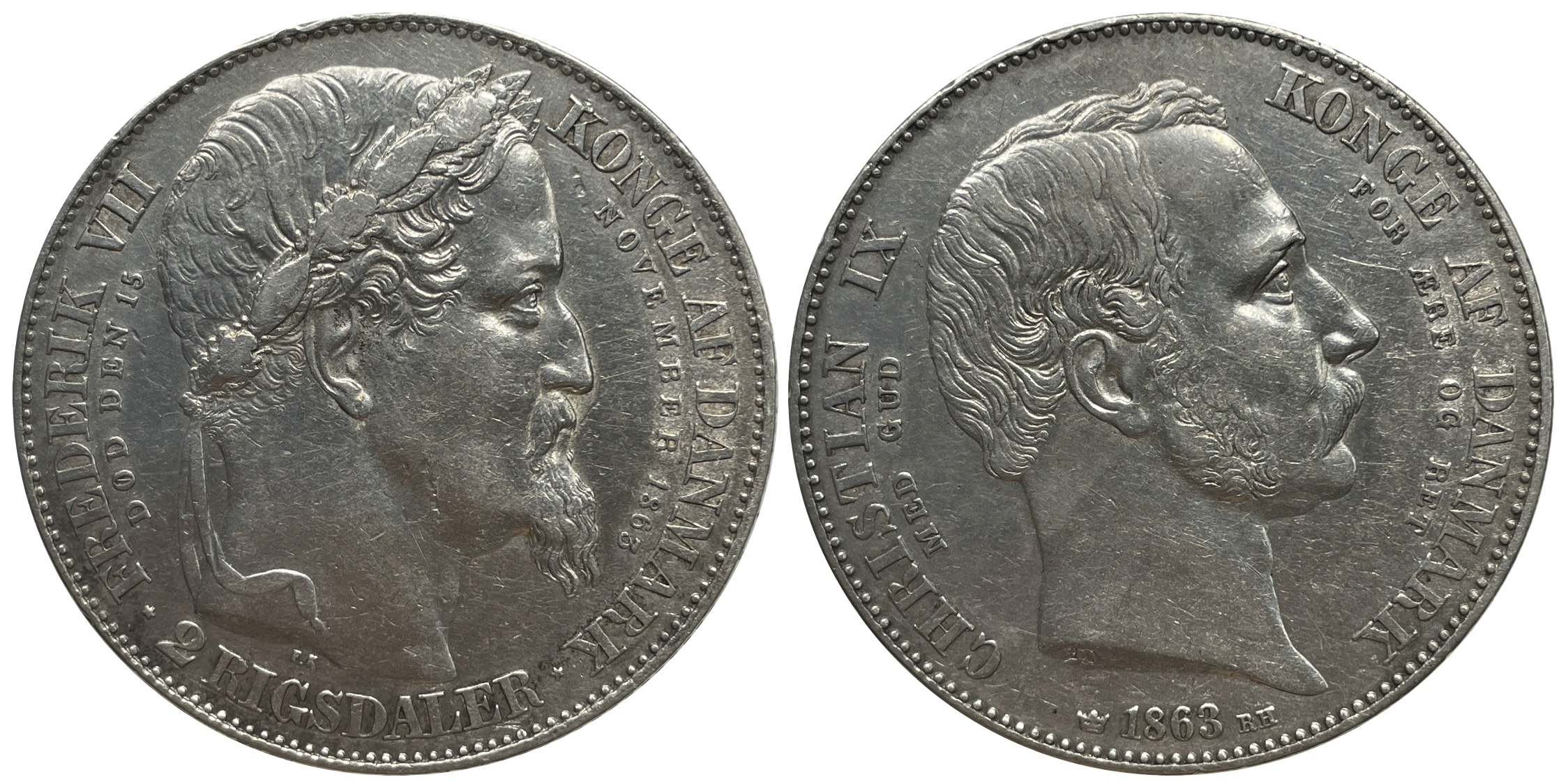
2 rigsdaler - Frederik VII Death and Accession of Christian IX

In the late 18th century, coins were issued in denominations of 1/2, 1, 2, 4, 8, 24 and 32 skilling, 1/15, 1/4, 1/3, 1/2 and 1 rigsdaler specie.

Between 1813 and 1815, copper coins bearing the legend "rigsbanktegn" ("rigsbank token") were issued in denominations of 2, 3, 4, 6, 12 and 16 skilling. From 1818, 1, 2 and 32 rigsbank skilling coins were issued, with 1 rigsdaler species from 1820. From 1826, gold coins were issued denominated in "Frederiks d'Or" or "Christians d'Or" (depending on the name of the ruling king). The "d'or" was nominally worth 10 rigsdaler, although the currency was on a silver standard. In 1838, 1/2 rigsbank skilling coins were introduced.

Between 1840 and 1843, a new coinage was introduced, consisting of 1/5, 1/2, 1, 2, 3, 4, 8, 16 and 32 rigsbank skilling, 1 rigsbankdaler and 1 rigsdaler species. Denominations between 4 rigsbank skilling and 1 rigsbankdaler were also inscribed with the denomination in the currency of Schleswig-Holstein, the Schilling Courant, of which there were 60 to the Speciethaler, equal to the rigsdaler species. These denominations were 1 1/4, 2 1/2, 5, 10 and 30 Schilling Courant.

The renaming of the currency units in 1854 lead to the issuing of coins for 1/2, 1, 4 and 16 skilling rigsmønt, 1 and 2 rigsdaler. Gold "d'or" coins continued to be issued (see above).

== Banknotes ==
In 1713, the government introduced notes for 1, 2 and 3 mark, 1, 5, 10, 25, 50 and 100 rigsdaler. The Copenhagen Assignation, Exchange and Loans Bank issued notes between 1737 and 1804 for 10, 20, 30, 40, 50 and 100 rigsdaler courant. Between 1791 and 1797, the Danish-Norwegian Specie Bank issued notes for 4, 8, 20, 40 and 80 rigsdaler specie. The treasury issued notes for 2 and 20 rigsdaler courant in 1808, followed by 8, 12 and 24 skilling notes in 1809-1810.

In 1813, the Rigsbank introduced notes in denominations of 1, 5, 10, 50 and 100 rigsbankdaler. These were followed, in 1819, by notes of the National Bank in the same denominations. After the change in name of the currency, the National Bank issued notes for 5, 10, 20, 50 and 100 rigsbankdaler.

== See also ==
- Norwegian rigsdaler
- Norwegian speciedaler
- Swedish riksdaler
