= Danish Royal Enclaves =

Former territory of Kingdom of Denmark

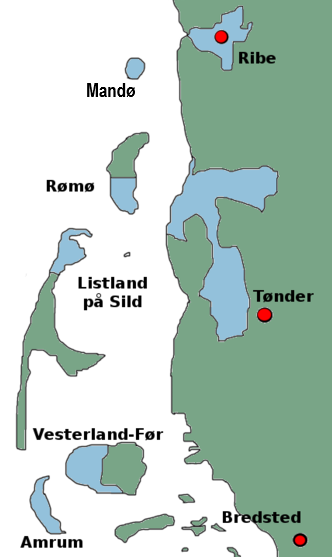
Blue: Denmark. Green: Schleswig.

The Danish Royal Enclaves (Danish: kongerigske enklaver) were the territory of the Kingdom of Denmark which was located within the Duchy of Schleswig. After the Second Schleswig War in 1864, most of these areas were, like the rest of Schleswig, ceded to the Kingdom of Prussia. Most of these areas were returned after the 1920 Schleswig plebiscites. Before the war of 1864, the Danish monarchy consisted of the Kingdom of Denmark and the duchies of Schleswig, Holstein and Lauenburg. Schleswig was a Danish fiefdom, while Holstein and Lauenborg were Holy Roman fiefdoms. All four areas belonged to the absolute monarch; but the government in Copenhagen was divided into the Danish Chancellery, which was responsible for the kingdom and finances, and the Schleswig-Holstein Chancellery, which was responsible for the duchies and foreign policy. The Kingdom and Duchies each had their own legislation and the official language was Danish in the Kingdom and German in the Duchies.
