= Cross-border cooperation =

Cross-border cooperation is the collaboration between adjacent areas across borders. In the European Union this is one of the forms of territorial cooperation (in addition to transnational and interregional cooperation). The European model is very diverse with cooperation between border regions or municipalities, or through specific cooperation structures. These structures are usually composed by public authorities (municipalities, districts, counties, regions) from different countries organized in working communities, euroregions or EGTCs (European Grouping of Territorial Cooperation).

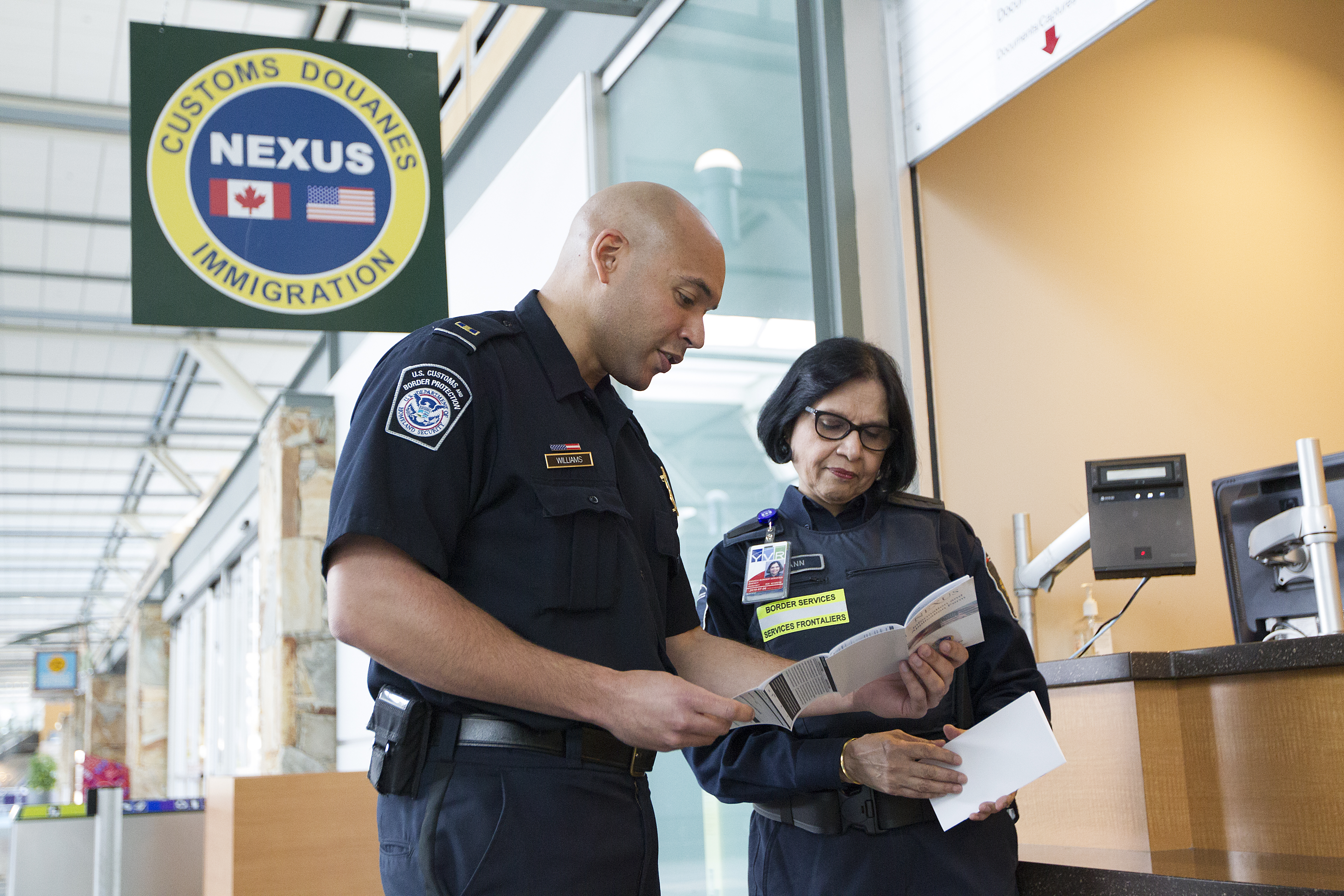
US and Canadian custom agents at Vancouver airport

== Cross-border collaboration at internal borders of the European Union ==
=== Interreg ===
European Territorial Cooperation, also commonly known as Interreg, is a key instrument from the European Cohesion policy supporting cross-border Interreg A cooperation across Europe. For the fifth programming period 2014-2020 Interreg A is exclusively funded through the European Regional Development Fund with EUR 6.6 billion for the fifth programming period, amounting for 1.9% of the total EU cohesion policy budget for 2014–2020.

=== EGTC ===
The European Grouping of Territorial Cooperation (EGTC) enables public bodies, regional and local authorities, associations and also EU Member States to create a new cooperation entity with a legal personality. The inception of this new instrument for cooperation at Community level in the framework of regional policy was in 2006. The establishment of a cooperation groupings aims to overcome the obstacles hindering cooperation across borders such as geographical, natural, cultural or administrative borders. EGTC facilitate cross-border, transnational and interregional cooperation by co-financing projects through European funds or without EU financial support. EGTC programmes are regulated under the framework of the Regulation (EC) No 1082/2006.

== Cross-border collaboration at external borders of the European Union ==
=== Interreg IPA CBC ===
Interreg Instrument for pre-accession Assistance (IPA) II contributes jointly to the pre-accession process for the period 2014–2020. Assistance is provided to 7 candidate countries and potential candidates from the Western Balkans and Turkey. As a single framework for candidates and potential candidates, IPA aims to foster cooperation between Member States and candidate/potential candidates and also among the candidate/ potential candidate countries. Thus, IPA is the instrument established by the EU to strengthen institutional capacity by providing them assistance and technical help in administrative, political, social and economic reforms. The new design of IPA, following up IPA 2007–2013, focus on a more strategic approach. For each country there is a strategic paper with a specific agenda promoting structural reforms and setting up priorities. Also a multi-Country Strategy Paper addresses priorities for regional cooperation or territorial cooperation.

- Budget allocation for IPA 2014-2020: EUR 11.7 billion
- Beneficiary countries: Albania, Bosnia and Herzegovina, Kosovo, Macedonia, Montenegro, Serbia and Turkey

=== ENI CBC ===
Interreg and the European Neighbourhood Instrument (ENI) finance jointly programmes strengthening bilateral relations between EU Member States and partner countries laying on the East and South of the EU's borders. Cooperation are especially in sectors like democracy, human rights, the rule of law, good governance and sustainable development.

- Budget allocation for ENI 2014-2020: EUR 15,433 billion + 10 million Euros from IPA for the participation of Turkey
- Beneficiary countries: Algeria, Armenia, Azerbaijan, Belarus, Egypt, Georgia, Israel, Jordan, Leba-non, Libya, Moldova, Morocco, Norway, Palestine, Russia, Ukraine, Tunisia, Syria. Turkey participates from IPA allocation.

== List ==
Name	Type	Countries
Cross-border Programme Bosnia and Herzegovina–Serbia	IPA	Bosnia and Herzegovina, Serbia
Danube 21 Euroregion	Euroregion	Bulgaria, Romania, Serbia
EuroBalkans	Euroregion	Bulgaria, Republic of Macedonia, Serbia
Stara Planina Euroregion	Euroregion	Bulgaria, Serbia
Mesta–Nestos Euroregion	Euroregion	Bulgaria, Greece
Drina–Sava–Majevica Euroregion	Euroregion	Bosnia and Herzegovina, Croatia, Serbia
Cross-border Programme Bulgaria–Serbia	IPA	Bulgaria, Serbia
Danube–Drava–Sava Euroregion	Euroregion	Bosnia and Herzegovina, Croatia, Hungary
Adriatic Ionian Euroregion	Euroregion	Albania, Bosnia and Herzegovina, Croatia, Italy, Montenegro, Slovenia
Interreg IPA Bulgaria-Turkey Cross-border Cooperation	Interreg IPA CBC	Bulgaria, Turkey
ENI CBC Black Sea Basin Programme	ENI CBC	Armenia, Bulgaria, Greece, Georgia, Moldova, Romania, Turkey, Ukraine

== See also ==
- European Regional Development Fund
- Budget of the European Union
- Treaty of Lisbon
- Europe 2020
- Euroregions
