= Norwegian phonology =

Systematic organization of spoken sounds of the Norwegian language

The sound system of Norwegian resembles that of Swedish. There is considerable variation among the dialects, and all pronunciations are considered by official policy to be equally correct – there is no official spoken standard, although it can be said that Eastern Norwegian Bokmål speech (not Norwegian Bokmål in general) has an unofficial spoken standard, called Urban East Norwegian or Standard East Norwegian (Norwegian: standard østnorsk), loosely based on the speech of the literate classes of the Oslo area. This variant is the most common one taught to foreign students.

There is no official standard variety of Norwegian, and local dialects are used extensively in spoken and visual media.

Unless noted otherwise, this article describes the phonology of Urban East Norwegian. The spelling is always Bokmål.

== Consonants ==
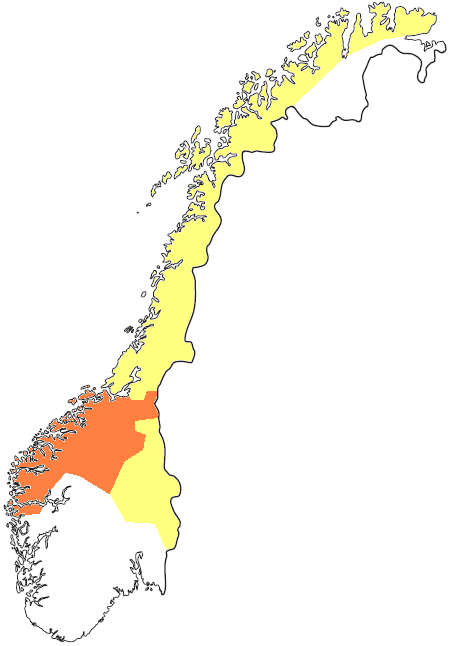
The map shows the extent of palatalization of long dental/alveolar consonants in Norway. palatalization only in stressed syllables palatalization both in stressed and unstressed syllables no palatalization

Consonant phonemes of Urban East Norwegian
		Labial	Dental/ Alveolar	Retroflex	(Alveolo-) Palatal	Velar	Glottal
Nasal		m	n	(ɳ)		ŋ	
Plosive	voiceless	p	t	(ʈ)		k	(ʔ)
Plosive	voiced	b	d	(ɖ)		ɡ	
Fricative		f	s	ʂ	ɕ ~ ç	(x)	h
Approximant		ʋ	l	(ɭ)	j		
Tap			ɾ ~ r	ɽ			

- /n, t, d/ are laminal [n̻, t̻, d̻], either alveolar [n, t, d] or denti-alveolar [n̪, t̪, d̪].
- /p, t, k/ are aspirated fully voiceless [pʰ, tʰ, kʰ], whereas /b, d, ɡ/ are unaspirated, either fully voiceless [p˭, t˭, k˭] or partially voiced [b̥˭, d̥˭, ɡ̊˭]. After /s/ within the same syllable, only unaspirated voiceless stops occur.
- /s/ is dentalized laminal alveolar [s̪] or (uncommonly) non-retracted apical alveolar [s̺].
- /ʂ/ is pronounced with protruded lips [ʂʷ]. The degree of protrusion depends on the rounding of the following vowel.
- /h/ is a (usually voiceless) fricative. The friction is normally glottal [h], but sometimes it is dorsal: palatal [ç] when near front vowels, velar [x] near back vowels. It can be voiced [ɦ ~ ʝ ~ ɣ] between two voiced sounds.
- /ʋ, l, j, r/ are partially voiced or fully voiceless [f, l̥, ç, ɾ̥] when they occur after /p, t, k, f/ (but not when /s/ precedes within the same syllable). The flap /r/ is also partially voiced or fully voiceless when it occurs postvocalically before /p, k, f/.
- The approximants /ʋ, j/ may be realized as fricatives [v, ʝ]:
  - /ʋ/ is sometimes a fricative, especially before a pause and in emphatic pronunciation.
  - There is not an agreement about the frequency of occurrence of the fricative allophone of /j/:
    - Kristoffersen (2000) states that /j/ is sometimes a fricative.
    - Vanvik (1979) states that the fricative variant of /j/ occurs often, especially before and after close vowels and in energetic pronunciation.
- /l/ is in the process of changing from laminal denti-alveolar [l̪] to apical alveolar [l̺], which leads to neutralization with the retroflex allophone [ɭ]. Laminal realization is still possible before vowels, after front and close vowels and after consonants that are not coronal, and is obligatory after /n, t, d/. A velarized laminal [ɫ̪] occurs after mid back vowels /ɔ, oː/, open back vowels /ɑ, ɑː/, and sometimes also after the close back vowels /ʊ, uː/. However, Endresen (1990) states that at least in Oslo, the laminal variant is not velarized, and the difference is only between an apical and a laminal realization.
- /r/ is a voiced apical alveolar flap [ɾ̺]. It is occasionally trilled [r], e.g. in emphatic speech.
- Retroflex allophones [ɳ, ʈ, ɖ] have been variously described as apical alveolar [n̺, t̺, d̺] and apical postalveolar [n̠, t̠, d̠].
- /ɽ/ alternates with /l/ in many words (in a small set of words also with /r/), but there is a small number of words in which only /ɽ/ occurs.
- /ŋ, k, ɡ/ are velar, whereas /j/ is palatal.
- /ç/ may be palatal [ç], but is often alveolo-palatal [ɕ] instead. It is unstable in many dialects, and younger speakers in Bergen, Stavanger and Oslo merge /ç/ with /ʂ/ into [ʂ].
- Glottal stop [ʔ] may be inserted before word-initial vowels. In very emphatic speech, it can also be inserted word-medially in stressed syllables beginning with a vowel.

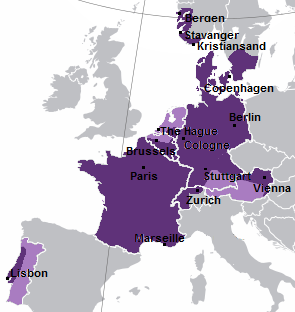
The language areas in Europe where some kind of guttural R may be heard by some local natives. Guttural R is not necessarily predominant in all of these areas.

Most of the retroflex (and postalveolar) consonants are mutations of [ɾ]+any other alveolar/dental consonant; rn /rn/ > [ɳ], rt /rt/ > [ʈ], rl /rl/ > [ɭ], rs /rs/ > [ʂ], etc. /rd/ across word boundaries (sandhi), in loanwords and in a group of primarily literary words may be pronounced [ɾd], e.g., verden [ˈʋæɾdn̩], but it may also be pronounced [ɖ] in some dialects. Most of the dialects in Eastern, Central and Northern Norway use the retroflex consonants. Most Southern and Western dialects do not have these retroflex sounds; in these areas a guttural realization of the /r/ phoneme is commonplace, and seems to be expanding. Depending on phonetic context voiceless ([χ]) or voiced uvular fricatives ([ʁ]) are used. (See map at right.) Other possible pronunciations include a uvular approximant [ʁ̞] or, more rarely, a uvular trill [ʀ]. There is, however, a small number of dialects that use both the uvular /r/ and the retroflex allophones.

The retroflex flap [ɽ], colloquially known to Norwegians as tjukk/tykk l ('thick l'), is a Central Scandinavian innovation that exists in Eastern Norwegian (including Trøndersk), the southmost Northern dialects, and the most eastern Western Norwegian dialects. It is non-existent in most Western and Northern dialects. Today there is doubtlessly distinctive opposition between /ɽ/ and /l/ in the dialects that do have /ɽ/, e.g. gård /ɡɔːɽ/ 'farm' and gal /ɡɑːl/ 'crazy' in many Eastern Norwegian dialects. Although traditionally an Eastern Norwegian dialect phenomenon, it was considered vulgar, and for a long time it was avoided. Nowadays it is considered standard in the Eastern and Central Norwegian dialects, but is still clearly avoided in high-prestige sociolects or standardized speech. This avoidance calls into question the status of /ɽ/ as a phoneme in certain sociolects.

According to Nina Grønnum, tjukk l in Trøndersk is actually a postalveolar lateral flap [ɺ̠].

== Vowels ==
Monophthongs of Urban East Norwegian on a formant chart, from Kristoffersen (2000:16–17). The vowel space is triangular, with /æː/ being much lower than /ɑː/. This suggests that the former has the quality of cardinal [a].

Short monophthongs of Urban East Norwegian on a vowel chart, based on formant values in Kristoffersen (2000:16–17)

Long monophthongs of Urban East Norwegian on a vowel chart, based on formant values in Kristoffersen (2000:16–17)

Diphthongs of Urban East Norwegian on a vowel chart, based on formant values in Kristoffersen (2000:16–17)

Marginal and non-native diphthongs of Urban East Norwegian on a vowel chart, based on formant values in Kristoffersen (2000:16–17)

Urban East Norwegian vowels
	Front				Central		Back	
	unrounded		rounded		Central		Back	
	short	long	short	long	short	long	short	long
Close	ɪ	iː	ʏ	yː	ʉ	ʉː	ʊ	uː
Mid	ɛ	eː	œ	øː	(ə)		ɔ	oː
Open	(æ)	æː					ɑ	ɑː
Diph.	œʏ̯ æɪ̯ æʉ̯ (ʉɪ̯ ɛɪ̯ ɔʏ̯ ɑɪ̯)							

- Unless preceding another vowel within the same word, all unstressed vowels are short.
- /ʊ/ is much rarer than /ʉ/ (when spelled ⟨u⟩) and, to a lesser extent, /ɔ/ (when spelled ⟨o⟩). Among the three vowels, only /ɔ/ has an unambiguous spelling ⟨å⟩ (alongside the ambiguous ⟨o⟩). When spelled with ⟨u⟩, the close back /ʊ/ appears especially before /m/ and /ŋ/. Many words that have the mid /ɔ/ (such as om /ˈɔm/ 'around' and opp /ˈɔp/ 'up') in the south-eastern part of Norway have the close /ʊ/ in other dialects: /ˈʊm, ˈʊp/.
- Kristoffersen states that [ə] is an unstressed allophone of /ɛ/. However, he also states that at least in his study, [ə] has the same formant values as /œ/, suggesting a phonemic merger of /œ/ with some instances of unstressed /ɛ/ (those that are centralized to [ə]) to [ə], though the vowels are hardly contrastive. For this reason, in this article it is treated as a separate phoneme that can only occur in unstressed non-initial syllables.
- The phonemic status of [æ] in Urban East Norwegian is unclear since [æ] and [æː] pattern as allophones of /ɛ/ and /eː/ before the flaps /r/ and /ɽ/. However, there are also words in which /eː/ is realized as [eː], despite the following flap, such as the present indicative ser [seːɾ] 'see, sees'.
- According to Kristoffersen, the diphthongs are non-phonemic. [œʏ, ɔʏ, æɪ, ɑɪ] can be analyzed as sequences of /œ, ɔ, ɛ, ɑ/ and /j/ which is allophonically labialized to [ɥ] after rounded vowels. His analysis requires positing an additional phoneme /w/ (which corresponds to the central [ʉ], not back [ʊ]) to analyze [æʉ] in a similar way. According to him, [æʉ] is best analyzed as /ɛw/.
  - The second element of /æʉ/ is often realized as labiodental [ʋ].
  - Some speakers have an additional diphthong /ɛɪ/ in their inventory which, like /ɔʏ/ and /ɑɪ/, is restricted to loanwords. According to Kristoffersen's analysis, /æɪ/ is then best analyzed as /æ/ + /j/, whereas the best phonemic representation of the marginal [ɛɪ] is /ɛj/.
  - Another (very rare) diphthong is /ʉɪ/, which appears only in the word hui ('haste').
- The second element of the fronting diphthongs can be fricated [ʝ]. This means that meg 'me' and høy 'high' can be pronounced [ˈmæʝ] and [ˈhœʝʷ], with two phonetic consonants and a monophthong. In emphatic speech an epenthetic schwa can follow the fricative ([ˈmæʝə̆, ˈhœʝʷə̆]). However, close vowels in closely related Swedish have also been reported to end in a fricative (as in sil [ˈsiʝl] 'strainer'), but the fricative element is typically analyzed as a part of the vowel. Frication of word-final close monophthongs accompanied with devoicing of the fricative element has been reported to occur in Parisian French and Dutch, with varying degrees of frequency. Those are invariably analyzed as vowels, not least because they are monophthongal in other positions.
- The native diphthongs /œʏ/, /æʉ/ and /æɪ/ are monophthongized in some dialects, with the first two merging with /øː/ and the last one with /eː/. This monophthongization is reflected in spelling in the case of Swedish and Danish, where it is a part of the standard language.

The following section describe each monophthong in detail.

=== Phonetic realisation ===
- /ɪ, iː, ɛ, eː, æ, æː, ɑ, ɑː/ are unrounded, whereas /ʏ, yː, ʉ, ʉː, ʊ, uː, œ, øː, ɔ, oː/ are rounded:
  - The close /ʏ, yː, ʉ, ʉː/ have been variously described as protruded [ʏʷ, yʷː] and compressed [ʉ͍, ʉ͍ː] as well as compressed [ʏ͍, y͍ː] and protruded [ʉʷ, ʉʷː]. The backness of /ʉ, ʉː/ has also been variously described as central [ʉ, ʉː] and near-front [ʉ̟, ʉ̟ː]. Therefore, /ʏ, yː/ may be differentiated from /ʉ, ʉː/ by backness and the type of rounding or even only by the type of rounding.
  - The close back /ʊ, uː/ are compressed [ʊ͍, u͍ː].
  - The mid /œ, øː, ɔ, oː/ are protruded [œʷ, øʷː, ɔʷ, oʷː].
- The height and backness of Norwegian vowels is as follows:
  - /ɪ, ʏ, ʉ, ʊ/ have been variously described as near-close [ɪ, ʏ, ʉ̞, ʊ] and close [i, y, ʉ, u]. In addition, /ɪ/ and /ʊ/ are more peripheral than the canonical values of IPA ⟨ɪ, ʊ⟩ ([ɪ̟ ~ i] and [ʊ̠ ~ u], respectively).
  - /iː, yː, ʉː, uː/ are phonetically close [iː, yː, ʉː, uː].
  - /ɛ/ is mid front [ɛ̝].
  - /eː, øː/ are close-mid [eː, øː]. /eː/ is front, yet /øː/ has been variously described as front [øː] and central [ɵː].
  - /œ/ has been variously described as open-mid front [œ] and mid central [ɞ̝].
  - /ɔ/ has been variously described as near-open back [ɔ̞] and close-mid back [o].
  - /oː/ has been variously described as mid back [o̞ː] and close-mid back [oː].
  - /æ, æː/ have often been described as near-open front [æ, æː]. However, Kristoffersen's formant chart places /æː/ much lower than /ɑː/, suggesting that the former has the quality of cardinal [a]. /æ/ is similarly lowered to [a].
  - /ɑ, ɑː/ are open back [ɑ, ɑː].
- /eː, øː/ are frequently realized as centering diphthongs [eə, øə]. /iː, yː, uː, oː/ can also be realized as [iə, yə, uə, oə], yet /ʉː, æː, ɑː/ are always monophthongal. However, according to Kvifte & Gude-Husken (2005), the diphthongal variants of /eː, øː, oː/ are opening [eɛ, øœ, oɑ], not centering.

=== Symbols ===
- The vowels /iː, yː, ʉː, eː, ə, ɔ, æ, æː/ are invariably transcribed with ⟨iː, yː, ʉː, eː, ə, ɔ, æ, æː⟩.
- /uː, øː/ are most often transcribed with ⟨uː, øː⟩, but /uː/ may be transcribed with an obsolete ⟨ɷː⟩ by older sources. In addition, Kristoffersen (2000) uses both ⟨øː⟩ and ⟨ɵː⟩ for /øː/. This article transcribes those vowels with ⟨uː, øː⟩.
- /oː/ is most often transcribed with ⟨ɔː⟩, yet this article uses ⟨oː⟩, following Kristoffersen (2000).
- The open back /ɑ, ɑː/ are most often transcribed with ⟨ɑ, ɑː⟩, but Vanvik (1979) transcribes them with ⟨a, aː⟩. This article uses the former set.
- The short close vowels /ɪ, ʏ, ʉ, ʊ/ are transcribed with either ⟨ɪ, ʏ, ʉ, ʊ⟩ or ⟨i, y, ʉ, u⟩. The short /ʉ/ is occasionally transcribed with ⟨ʉ̞⟩ or a non-IPA symbol ⟨ᵿ⟩ instead, whereas /ʊ/ is transcribed with an obsolete symbol ⟨ɷ⟩ in some older sources. This article uses ⟨ɪ, ʏ, ʉ, ʊ⟩.
- The short mid front vowels /ɛ, œ/ are transcribed with either ⟨ɛ, œ⟩ or ⟨e, ø⟩. This article uses ⟨ɛ, œ⟩.

== Accent ==
Map of the major tonal dialects of Norwegian and Swedish, from Riad (2014). • Dark areas have a low tone in accent 2, whereas the light areas have a high tone in accent 2. • The isogloss marks the boundary between connective and non-connective dialects. East and north of it, all of the compounds get accent 2, whereas west and south of the isogloss, compounds vary in accent. Note that contrary to the information in the map, the dialects of Rogaland, Aust-Agder and Trøndelag are not traditionally classified as East Norwegian, but as West Norwegian, South Norwegian and Trøndersk, respectively.

Norwegian is a stress-accent language, but has elements of pitch accent, with two distinct pitch patterns. They are used to differentiate polysyllabic words with otherwise identical pronunciation. Although difference in spelling occasionally allows the words to be distinguished in the written language (such as bønner/bønder), in most cases the minimal pairs are written alike. For example, in most Norwegian dialects, the word uttale ('pronounce') is pronounced using tone 1 (/ˈʉ̀ːttɑːlə/), while uttale ('pronunciation') uses tone 2 (/ˈʉ̂ːttɑːlə/).

There are significant variations in the realization of the pitch accent between dialects. In most of Eastern Norway, including the capital Oslo, the so-called low pitch dialects are spoken. In these dialects, accent 1 uses a low flat pitch in the first syllable, while accent 2 uses a high, sharply falling pitch in the first syllable and a low pitch in the beginning of the second syllable. In both accents, these pitch movements are followed by a rise of intonational nature (phrase accent), the size (and presence) of which signals emphasis/focus and which corresponds in function to the normal accent in languages that lack lexical tone, such as English. That rise culminates in the final syllable of an accentual phrase, while the fall to utterance-final low pitch that is so common in most languages is either very small or absent. On the other hand, in most of western and northern Norway (the so-called high-pitch dialects) accent 1 is falling, while accent 2 is rising in the first syllable and falling in the second syllable or somewhere around the syllable boundary.

The two tones can be transcribed on the first vowel as ⟨ɑ̀⟩ for accent 1 and ⟨ɑ̂⟩ for accent 2; the modern reading of the IPA tone diacritics (low ⟨ɑ̀⟩ and falling ⟨ɑ̂⟩) corresponds to the pronunciation of eastern Norway, whereas an older tradition of using diacritics to represent the shape of the pitch trace (falling ⟨ɑ̀⟩ and rising-falling ⟨ɑ̂⟩) corresponds to the pronunciation of western Norway.

Accent 1 generally occurs in words that were monosyllabic in Old Norse, and accent 2 in words that were polysyllabic.

=== Tonal accents and morphology ===
In many dialects, the accents take on a significant role in marking grammatical categories. Thus, the ending (T1)—en implies determinate form of a masculine monosyllabic noun (båten /ˈbòːtən/ 'boat', bilen /ˈbìːlən/, 'car'), whereas (T2)-en denotes either determinate form of a masculine bisyllabic noun or an adjectivised noun/verb (moden /ˈmûːdən/ 'mature'). Similarly, the ending (T1)—a denotes feminine singular determinate monosyllabic nouns (boka /ˈbùːkɑ/ 'book', rota /ˈrùːtɑ/ 'root') or neuter plural determinate nouns (husa /ˈhʉ̀ːsɑ/ 'houses', lysa /ˈlỳːsɑ/ 'lights'), whereas the ending (T2)—a denotes the preterite of weak verbs (rota /ˈrûːtɑ/ 'made a mess', husa /ˈhʉ̂ːsɑ/ 'housed'), and feminine singular determinate bisyllabic nouns (bøtta /ˈbœ̂tːɑ/ 'bucket', ruta /ˈrʉ̂ːtɑ/ 'square').

In Eastern Norwegian the tone difference may also be applied to groups of words, with different meaning as a result. Gro igjen for example, means 'grow anew' when pronounced with tone 1 /ˈɡrùː‿ɪjən/, but 'grow over' when pronounced with tone 2 /ˈɡrûː‿ɪjən/. In other parts of Norway, this difference is achieved instead by the shift of stress (gro igjen /ˈɡruː ɪjən/ vs. gro igjen /ɡruː ɪˈjɛn/).

=== In compound words ===
In a compound word, the pitch accent is lost on one of the elements of the compound (the one with weaker or secondary stress), but the erstwhile tonic syllable retains the full length (long vowel or geminate consonant) of a stressed syllable.

=== Monosyllabic tonal accents ===
In some dialects of Norwegian, mainly those from Nordmøre and Trøndelag to Lofoten, there may also be tonal opposition in monosyllables, as in [bîːl] ('car') vs. [bìːl] ('axe'). In a few dialects, mainly in and near Nordmøre, the monosyllabic tonal opposition is also represented in final syllables with secondary stress, as well as double tone designated to single syllables of primary stress in polysyllabic words. In practice, this means that one gets minimal pairs like: [hɑ̀ːnɪɲː] ('the rooster') vs. [hɑ̀ːnɪ̂ɲː] ('get him inside'); [brʏ̂ɲːɑ] ('in the well') vs. [brʏ̂ɲːɑ̂] ('her well'); [læ̂nsmɑɲː] ('sheriff') vs. [læ̂nsmɑ̂ːɲː] ('the sheriff'). Amongst the various views on how to interpret this situation, the most promising one may be that the words displaying these complex tones have an extra mora. This mora may have little or no effect on duration and dynamic stress, but is represented as a tonal dip.

Other dialects with tonal opposition in monosyllabic words have done away with vowel length opposition. Thus, the words [vɔ̀ːɡ] ('dare') vs. [vɔ̀ɡː] ('cradle') have merged into [vɔ̀ːɡ] in the dialect of Oppdal Municipality.

=== Loss of tonal accents ===
Some forms of Norwegian have lost the tonal accent opposition. This includes mainly parts of the area around (but not including) Bergen; the Brønnøysund area; to some extent, the dialect of Bodø; and, also to various degrees, many dialects between Tromsø and the Russian border. Faroese and Icelandic, which have their main historical origin in Old Norse, also show no tonal opposition. It is, however, not clear whether these languages lost the tonal accent or whether the tonal accent was not yet there when these languages started their separate development. Standard Danish, Rigsdansk, replaces tonal accents with the stød, whilst some southern, insular dialects of Danish preserve the tonal accent to different degrees. The Finland Swedish dialects also lack a tonal accent; no such phenomenon exists in Finnish.

=== Pulmonic ingressive ===
The words ja ('yes') and nei ('no') are sometimes pronounced with inhaled breath (pulmonic ingressive) in Norwegian. The same phenomenon occurs across the other Scandinavian languages, and can also be found in German, French, Finnish and Japanese, to name a few.

== Sample ==
The sample text is a reading of the first sentence of The North Wind and the Sun by a 47-year-old professor from Oslo's Nordstrand borough.

=== Phonetic transcription ===
[²nuːɾɑˌʋɪnˑn̩ ɔ ˈsuːln̩ ²kɾɑŋlət ɔm ʋɛm ɑ dɛm sɱ̍ ˈʋɑː ɖɳ̍ ²stæɾ̥kəstə]

=== Orthographic version ===
Nordavinden og solen kranglet om hvem av dem som var den sterkeste.

== See also ==
- Norwegian dialects
- Danish dialects
- Danish phonology
- Swedish phonology
