= Gudbrandsdalsmål =

Norwegian dialects of Oppland, Norway

- Dølamål
- Region: Gudbrandsdalen and upper Folldal Municipality, Innlandet county
- Language family: Indo-European: Germanic; Northwest Germanic; North Germanic; West Scandinavian; Norwegian; Eastern Norwegian; Midland Norwegian; Gudbrandsdalsmål

Language codes
- ISO 639-3: –
- Glottolog: None
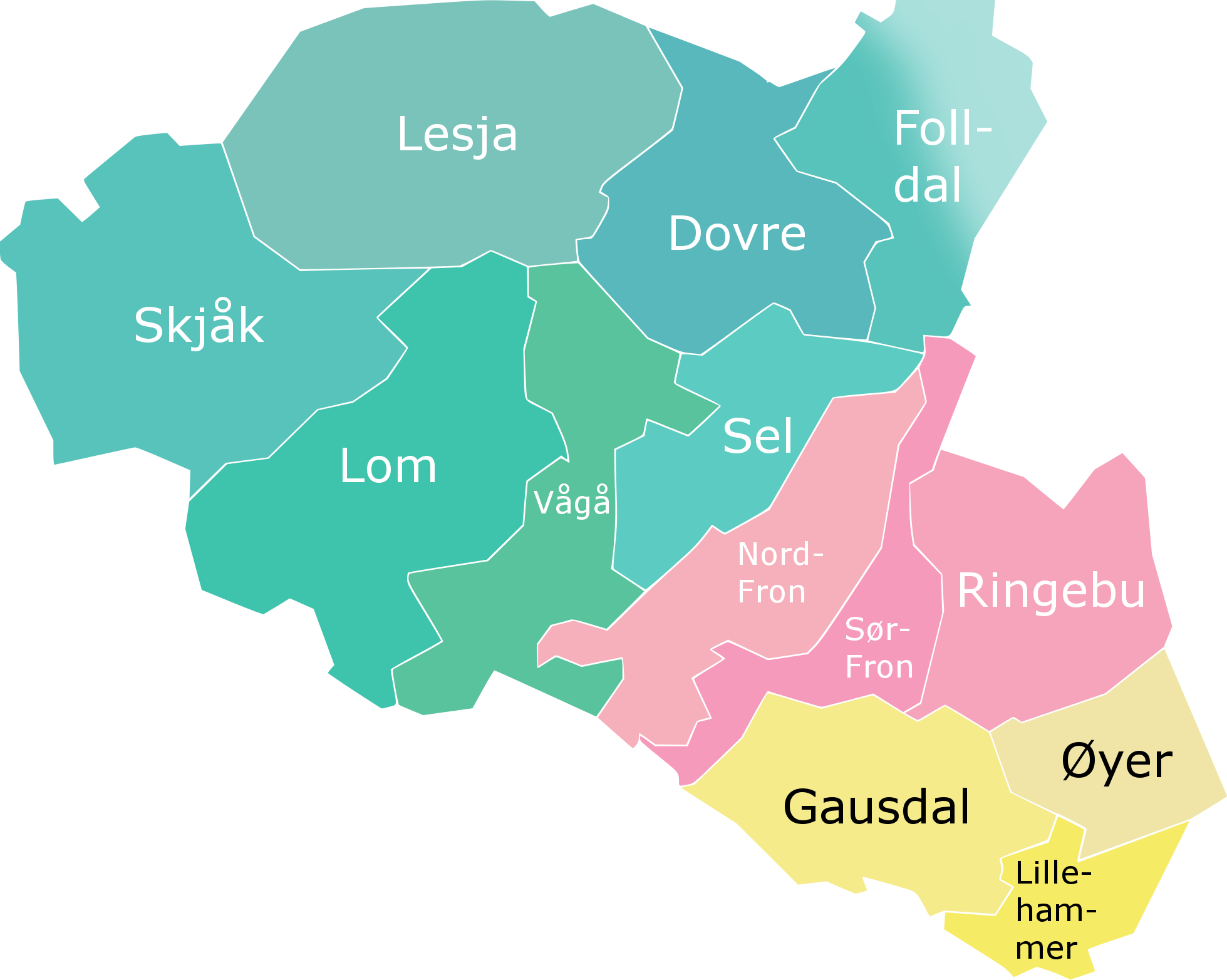
- Administrative map of Gudbrandsdalen. North Valley Middle Valley South Valley

Gudbrandsdalsmål or Dølamål is a group of Norwegian dialects traditionally spoken in the traditional district of Gudbrandsdalen, a large valley in Innlandet county.

The dialect can be divided into three subgroups: North Gudbrandsdalen, South Gudbrandsdalen and Lillehammermål. Lillehammermål is the variant spoken in Lillehammer, and as it is an urban dialect, it has great simplifications and more in common with the Urban East Norwegian dialect than the other two dialects from Gudbrandsdalen. An important distinction between South Gudbrandsdalen and North Gudbrandsdalen dialects is that North Gudbrandsdalen has more Nynorsk features than South Gudbrandsdalen. For example, the Vestlandsk (dialect in Western Norway) form of the negation adverb ikkje is used in North Gudbrandsdalen, but the form itte is used in South Gudbrandsdalen and Lillehammer (this form is also used in the dialects in Hedmark, Vestoppland, Numedal, and inner Vestfold).

This dialect is one of several rural Norwegian dialects that has preserved many features from Old Norse which are not present in other urban dialects.
