= American Norwegian =

Set of varieties of the Norwegian language native to the United States

- amerikansk norsk
- Native to: United States
- Region: Midwest, West
- Language family: Indo-European: Germanic; North Germanic; West Scandinavian (disputed); Norwegian; American Norwegian
- Early forms: Old Norse: Old West Norse; Old Norwegian; Middle Norwegian; Modern Norwegian
- Writing system: Latin (Norwegian alphabet)

Language codes
- ISO 639-3: –
- Glottolog: None
- IETF: no-US

American Norwegian (Norwegian: amerikansk norsk) is a koiné dialect of Norwegian spoken by Norwegian Americans.

While American Norwegian is not archaic in its use of grammar, its lexicon can be described as slightly archaic.

== History ==
=== Immigration ===
American Norwegian formed as a result of Norwegians migrating to the United States. In 1825, the first organized emigration party consisting of several dozen Norwegians left Stavanger on board the Restauration. Early migration was largely due to religious persecution, particularly of Quakers and Haugeans, but intensified and diversified in the second half of the 19th century. Throughout the 19th and 20th centuries, Norwegian migration to North America continued, primarily through the White Star Line, and the Cunard Line.

=== Speakers ===
Between 1910 and the First World War, one million Americans had Norwegian as their first language, many of whom subscribed to Norwegian-language newspapers, such as Decorah Posten and Skandinaven. As of 2025, it is moribund.

== Grammar ==
Variations in grammar indicate koineization.

=== Gender ===
In Norwegian, grammatical gender is opaque, meaning a word's gender is not immediately obvious based on meaning or phonetics. Children, thus, often overgeneralise masculine gender. This same effect can be observed in heritage speakers. This overgeneralization is far less common when words are used in their definite form. Similarly, overgeneralization is seen more in prenominal possession compared to postnominal possession.

Token distributions of the three indefinite articles in American and Eastern Norwegian dialects
Gender	CANS (N = 50)	NorDiaCorp (old, N = 127)	NorDiaCorp (young, N = 66)
M	76.3% (753)	64.8% (1833)	74.9% (909)
F	16.9% (164)	18.2% (514)	5.4% (66)
N	6.9% (67)	17.0% (481)	19.7% (239)

Percentage of nouns appearing with a non-target-consistent indefinite article
Direction	Tokens	Types
F→M	39.0% (92/236)	43.1% (31/72)
N→M	48.8% (80/164)	69.4% (34/49)
N→F	10.4% (17/164)	26.5% (13/49)

In some European Norwegian dialects, feminine and masculine gender have combined into common gender, while in other dialects, words considered feminine elsewhere are masculine.

==== Examples ====
Below are examples of non-target consistent indefinite articles:

Masculine article used with feminine word

Har du en ku enda?
Have you a.M cow.F still?

Masculine article used with neuter word

Hun var på en fjell
She was on a.M mountain.N

Feminine article used with neuter word

Det var ei menneske
It was a.F human.N

== Lexicon ==
Pronouns in Norwegian and American dialects are relatively similar.

Due to less input in Norwegian, Norwegian-Americans acquire fewer native words. This has led to more loaning and calquing from English into American Norwegian (e.g. lage leving, a literal translation of "make [a] living", rather than the native expression tjene til livets opphold) as well as the preservation of words now obsolete in European Norwegian. Many such words are absorbed and adopt Norwegian pronunciation and grammar. Some of these include: farm, kæunti (county) and seidvåk (sidewalk). New words have also been developed, such as American hå ti, replacing European når, meaning "when".

== See also ==
- Urban East Norwegian – Norwegian dialect spoken in Oslo and Eastern Norway
- Bergensk – Norwegian dialect spoken in Bergen
- Trøndersk – Norwegian dialect spoken in Trøndelag
- American English – English dialect spoken in United States
