= Norwegian accent =

Norwegian accent(s) may refer to:

- Norwegian phonology, the sounds used in the Norwegian language
- Norwegian dialects, the different varieties found in the Norwegian language
- a non-native English variety spoken by Norwegians and Norwegian speakers
