= Bergensk =

Dialect of Norwegian from Bergen, Norway

- Bergensk
- Pronunciation: Urban East Norwegian: [ˈbæɾɡənsk]
- Native to: Norway
- Region: Vestlandet (Bergen)
- Ethnicity: Norwegians
- Native speakers: 285,000 (2024)
- Language family: Indo-European: Germanic; Northwest Germanic; West Scandinavian; Norwegian; Bergensk
- Early forms: Old Norse: Old West Norse; Middle Norwegian
- Standard forms: written Bokmål (official); written Nynorsk (official)
- Writing system: Latin (Norwegian alphabet); Norwegian Braille

Language codes
- ISO 639-3: None (mis)
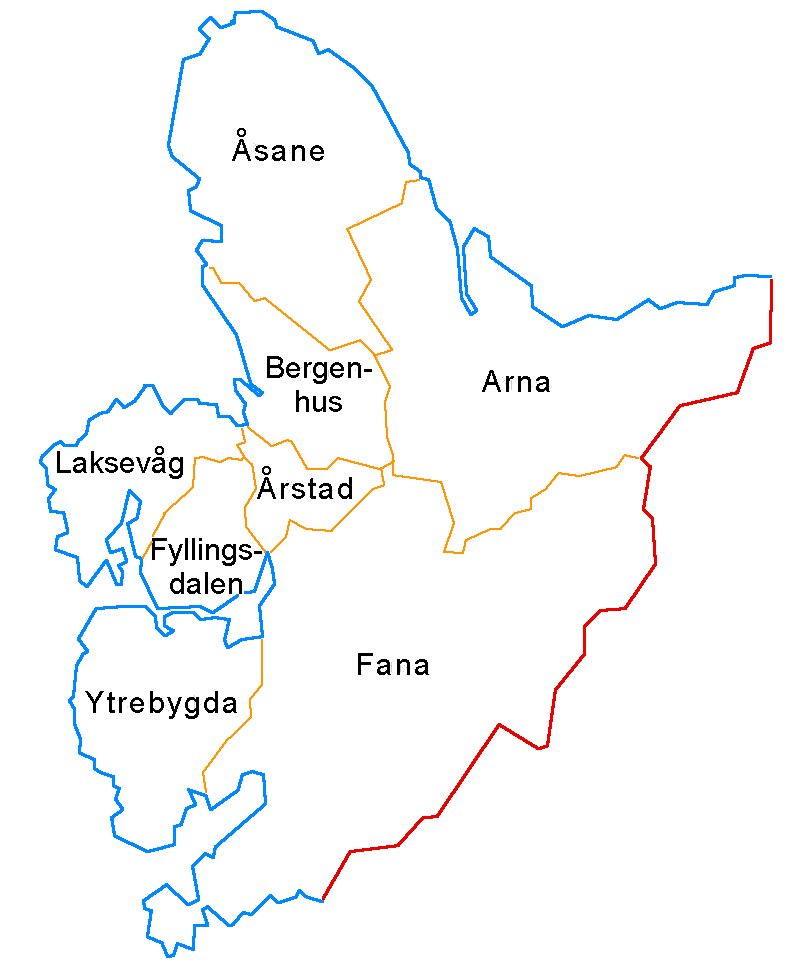
- Boroughs in Bergen

Bergensk or Bergen dialect is a dialect of Norwegian used in Bergen, Norway. It is easy for Norwegians to recognise, as it is more distinguishable from other dialects in Vestland than, for example, the Stavanger dialect (Stavangersk) from the dialects of Rogaland, and the Trondheim dialect from Trøndelag dialects.

== Early influence from Low German and Danish ==
Many Low German and German words found their way to Norwegian through the Bergen dialect, which makes up almost 35% of the basic Norwegian vocabulary. The long history of multi-lingual coexistence in Bergen has made the dialect more susceptible to simplifications, in order to ease communication, and the influence of Danish and Low German are apparent in the modern Bergen dialect's phonetics.

Bergen's strong foreign influence, such as Hanseatic League merchants in the period from about 1350 to 1750, had a profound effect on the Bergen dialect. The Hanseatic merchants spoke varieties of Low German, and perhaps a pidgin in dealings with the locals. Bergen was the only major Norwegian city during the Dano-Norwegian union from 1536 to 1814, and the Bergen dialect absorbed more of language trends from abroad, such as from Danish, than other Norwegian dialects. The written standard of the time, was based on the Copenhagen dialect of the Danish language, and it continued to affect Bergensk well into the 20th century. A Dano-Norwegian koiné, resembling the non-standard Riksmål, is still spoken, although in recent decades has become much more similar to Bokmål.

== Gender ==
Bergensk is one of two dialects in Norway with only two grammatical genders, the other being the dialect spoken in Lyngen Municipality. All others have three (excepting sociolects in other Norwegian urban areas). The feminine gender disappeared in the 16th century. One theory is that this was partly fueled by an influence from Danish, which became the written language and already had eliminated the distinction between masculine and feminine forms, and as a simplification to ease communication between Norwegians and Germans or between people from Bergen and other parts of Norway.

The Old Norse -n ending was retained in the Bergen (Old Norse hon > hon), but lost elsewhere (hon > ho). The -nn ending was simplified to -n everywhere. Since the feminine definite articles were -in and -an in Old Norse, while the masculine ending was -inn, another theory is that the retention of -n, combined with an earlier reduction of unstressed vowels, caused the masculine and feminine genders to merge. In other dialects, -in and -an lost the final -n, underwent nasalization and developed into -a in a majority of the modern Norwegian dialects (other variants include -e, -i and -o) whereas -inn developed into -en.

== Definite form of given names ==
Bergensk is one of the few Norwegian dialects that can use the definite for given names. In Bergen personal names can be inflected like common nouns, so Kari becomes Karien, Pere becomes Peren or Kåre Willoch becomes Kåre Willochen. Not all Bergensk speakers will use this form and the usage depends on the social situation. Similar construction of personal names can be found in east Norwegian dialects.

== Phonology ==
The /r/ phoneme is realized uvularly, either as a trill [ʀ] or a fricative [ʁ]. The latter is the normal French pronunciation. It probably spread to Bergen (and Kristiansand) some time in the 18th century, overtaking the alveolar trill [r] in the time span of about 2-3 generations. Until recent decades' developments in neighboring rural dialects, this was an easy way of distinguishing them from the Bergen dialect. Nowadays, the uvular /r/ is a feature of a much larger area of the southwestern Norway than Bergen. Broader speakers may realize the coda /r/ as a central vowel [ɐ], but that is stigmatized.

- /n, t, d, l/ are alveolar [n, t, d, l].
- As in Stavanger and Oslo, younger speakers of the Bergen dialect tend to merge /ç/ with /ʃ/.

== Recent developments ==
In the 19th and 20th centuries, the literacy rate improved, which gave a strong influence from Riksmål, and later Bokmål. Nynorsk, Norway's other written language, was considered rural and thus lacking prestige, and has not had a strong influence on the dialect. Subsequently, large parts of the German-inspired vocabulary unique for Bergen disappeared. Plural endings are used less frequently, for example huser (houses) has become hus, which is correct Bokmål. Also, pronunciations have shifted slightly towards standard East Norwegian (Standard Østnorsk), probably as a result of the shift of power towards Oslo. For example, "pære" (pear), which was formerly pronounced as péræ, is now pronounced pæræ.

== English verbs ==
When English verbs are used as substitute for Norwegian verbs, in the past tense they are given an -et ending, like walket and drivet. This is different from the other Norwegian dialects, most of which use an -a ending.

== See also ==
- Danish dialects

== Bibliography ==
- Kristoffersen, Gjert (2000), The Phonology of Norwegian, Oxford University Press, ISBN 978-0-19-823765-5
- Nesse, Agnete (2003), Slik ble vi bergensere - Hanseatene og bergensdialekten, Sigma Forlag, ISBN 82-7916-028-0
- Vanvik, Arne (1979), Norsk fonetikk, Oslo: Universitetet i Oslo, ISBN 82-990584-0-6

== Other sources ==
- Kerswill, Paul (2002). "A dialect with 'great inner strength'? The perception of nativeness in the Bergen speech community". In Daniel Long and Dennis Preston (ed.). A handbook of perceptual dialectology. Vol. 2. Amsterdam: Benjamins. pp. 155–175.

== Related reading ==
- Fintoft, Knut (1970), Acoustical Analysis and Perception of Tonemes in Some Norwegian Dialects (Universitetsforl)
- Haugen, Einar Ingvald (1948), Norwegian dialect studies since 1930 (University of Illinois)
- Husby, Olaf (2008), An Introduction to Norwegian Dialects (Tapir Academic Press)
