= Arendalsk =

Dialect of Norwegian used in Arendal

- Arendal dialect, Arendal Norwegian
- Ændalsk
- Region: Arendal
- Language family: Indo-European: Germanic; Northwest Germanic; North Germanic; West Scandinavian; Norwegian; Arendalsk

Language codes
- ISO 639-3: –
- Glottolog: None

Arendalsk, Arendal dialect or Arendal Norwegian (Bokmål and Nynorsk: Arendalsk, Arendalsdialekten; the Arendal dialect: Ændalsk) is a dialect of Norwegian used in Arendal Municipality.

== Phonology ==
- Intervocalic /p, t, k/ are realized as voiced [b, d, ɡ]. This feature appeared in this dialect in the 20th century.
- A uvular [ʀ] realization of /r/ was established in Arendal before the 20th century.
- /ʀ/ is frequently dropped, so that e.g. Lars becomes Læs.
- The ending /əʀ/ is pronounced [ɔ] (as in Danish), so that the word for 'basement' is kjeller in Bokmål, but kjellå in the Arendal dialect.

According to the linguist Gjert Kristoffersen, a recent change is that the postvocalic /ʀ/ is vocalized to [æ̯], rather than dropped. The phonetic diphthongs [ʉæ̯] and [uæ̯] may be monophthongized and lowered to, respectively, [œː] and [ɔː], so that the words for 'to do gymnastics' and 'thorn' (which phonemically are, respectively, /ˈtʉ̂ʀne/ and /ˈtûʀne/) vary in their phonetic realization between, respectively, [ˈtʉ̂æ̯nə] ~ [ˈtœ̂ːnə] and [ˈtûæ̯nə] ~ [ˈtɔ̂ːnə]. This process may be extended to mid vowels.

=== Tonemes ===
==== Phonetic realization ====
Tonemes of the Arendal dialect are the same as those of the Oslo dialect; accent 1 is low-rising, whereas accent 2 is falling-rising.

== Notable speakers ==
- Gjert Kristoffersen
- Rockebandet Ændal, a heavy metal band that sings in the Arendal dialect

== Bibliography ==
- Kristoffersen, Gjert (2000), The Phonology of Norwegian, Oxford University Press, ISBN 978-0-19-823765-5
