= Meldal dialect =

Norwegian dialect of Meldal, Norway

Meldal Norwegian
- Region: Meldal Municipality
- Language family: Indo-European: Germanic; Northwest Germanic; North Germanic; West Scandinavian; Norwegian; Trøndersk; Meldal Norwegian

Language codes
- ISO 639-3: –
- Glottolog: None

Meldal dialect or Meldal Norwegian is a dialect of Norwegian used in the area of the old Meldal Municipality (now part of Orkland Municipality). It is a variety of Trøndersk.

== Phonology ==
=== Vowels ===
- /i/ is retracted to [ɨ], a distinctive feature of the dialect.
- Old Norse diphthongs ⟨ei⟩ and ⟨øy⟩ are realized as long monophthongs [eː] and [øː]. This is the case in a large part of Sør-Trøndelag in general.
