= Vestlandsk =

Norwegian dialects of western Norway

- Region: western Norway
- Language family: Indo-European: Germanic; Northwest Germanic; North Germanic; West Scandinavian; Norwegian; Vestlandsk

Language codes
- ISO 639-3: –
- Glottolog: vest1240

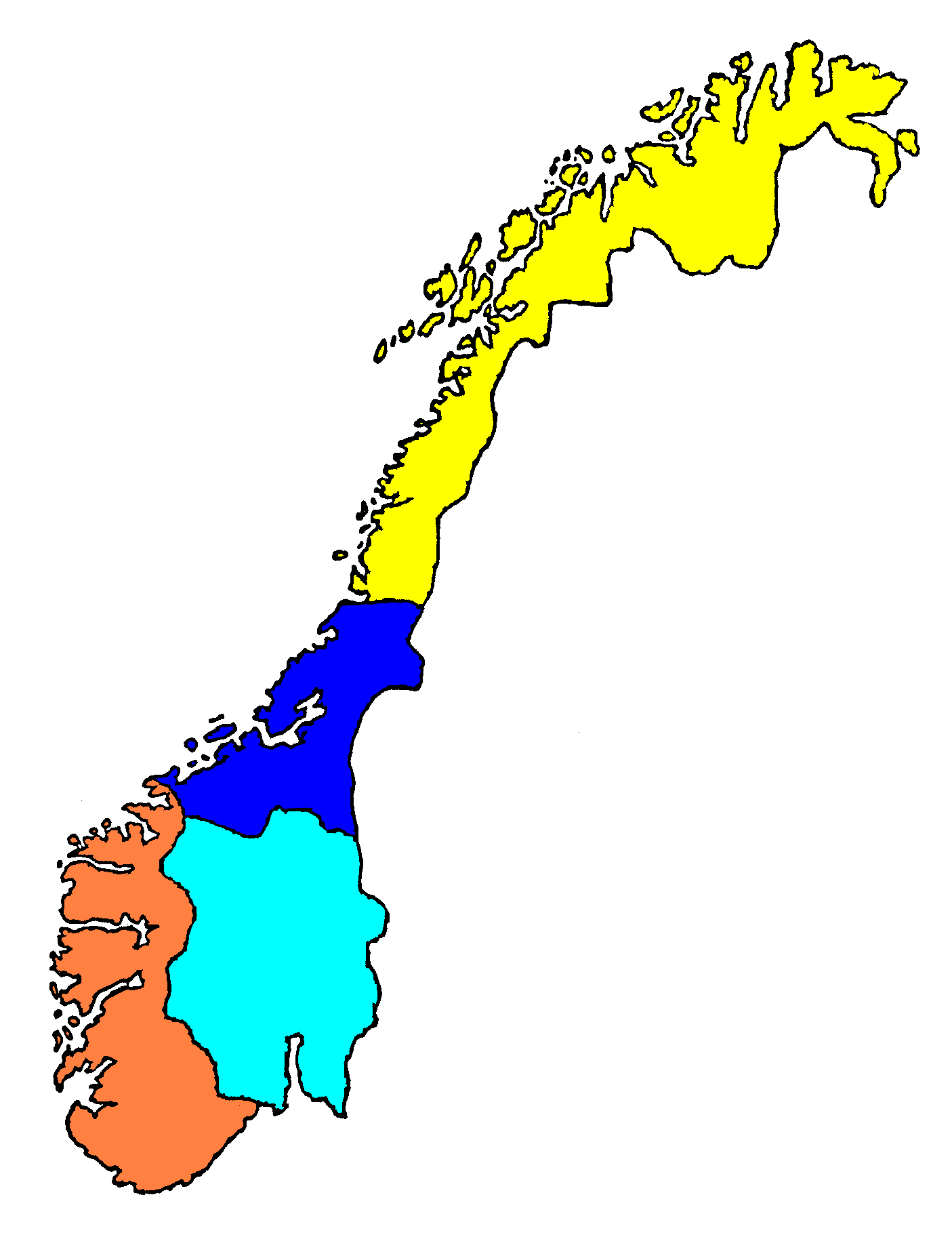
Norway divided by the prevalence of four dialect groups: North Norwegian Trøndelag Norwegian East Norwegian West Norwegian

Vestlandsk or Vestlandske dialekter (lit. 'West Norwegian') is a collective term for the dialects that are spoken on the coast of western Norway in the area ranging from Romsdal in the north to Agder in the south. These dialects can furthermore be split into north-western dialects (Nordvestlandske dialekter), south-western dialects (Sørvestlandske dialekter, and southern dialects (Sørlandske dialekter).

- Nordvestlandske dialekter (lit. 'North-Western dialects') have e-infinitive, and extends from the middle of Sogn og Fjordane to Romsdal. Of these, one can mention:
  - Jølstramål – centering on the old Jølster Municipality
  - Sunnmørsdialekt – collective term for dialects in Sunnmøre
  - Romsdalsdialekt – dialect of Romsdal
- Sørvestlandske dialekter (lit. 'South-western dialects') have a-infinitive, and extends from the inner Sogn og Fjordane, through Hordaland and Rogaland and western part of Agder. Of these, one can mention:
  - Bergensk, Haugesundsk, Stavangersk – these are city dialects (bymål). They have strong simplification, which is characteristic for all urban dialects (bydialekter), but originate from the dialects of the area with which they have much in common.
  - Jærsk – dialect in Jæren
  - Strilamål – dialect of Strilelandet, an area around Bergen
  - Sunnhordlandsdialekt – dialect of Sunnhordland
- Sørlandske dialekter (lit. 'Southern dialects') have /p, t, k/-voicing, guttural R and a-endings, and is spoken in the eastern part of Agder and part of Telemark.

== See also ==
- Norwegian dialects

== Other sources ==
- Jahr, Ernst Håkon (1990) Den Store dialektboka (Oslo: Novus) ISBN 8270991678
- Kristoffersen, Gjert (2000) The Phonology of Norwegian (Oxford University Press) ISBN 978-0-19-823765-5
- Vanvik, Arne (1979) Norsk fonetikk (Oslo: Universitetet i Oslo) ISBN 82-990584-0-6
