= Brønnøy dialect =

Norwegian dialect

Brønnøymål
- Region: Brønnøy
- Language family: Indo-European: Germanic; Northwest Germanic; North Germanic; West Scandinavian; Norwegian; Helgelandish dialects; South Helgelandish; Brønnøymål

Language codes
- ISO 639-3: –
- Glottolog: None

The Brønnøy dialect (Norwegian: Brønnøymål or Sørvest-helgelandsk) is a dialect of Norwegian used in Brønnøy Municipality and also spoken in Vevelstad, Vega and northern Bindalen.

== Phonology ==
=== Tonemes ===
Unlike most Norwegian dialects, the Brønnøy dialect lacks tonal accents. For example, the noun huse ("the house") and the verb å huse ("to house") are homophonous.

== Grammar ==
=== Infinitives ===
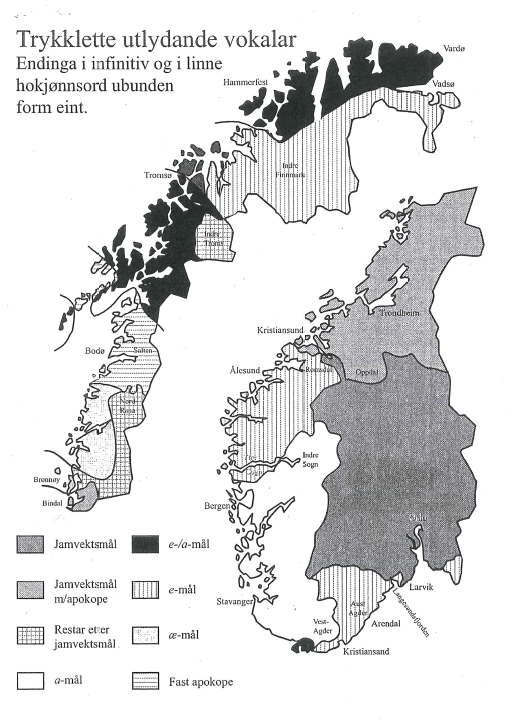
Map over unstressed word-final vowels, the infinitive ending, and the ending of weak feminine nouns in the indefinite singular.

In Brønnøy, one finds remnants of the East Norwegian (Austlandet and Trøndelag) system of a kløyvd or "split" infinitive and thus forms such as å veta, å lesa, å jaga, å moka (jamvektsord lit. "equally weighted words") and å hør, å kast, å kjøp (overvektsord lit. "over-weighted words").
