= Sandnes dialect =

Norwegian dialect of Sandnes, Norway

- Region: Sandnes
- Language family: Indo-European: Germanic; Northwest Germanic; North Germanic; West Scandinavian; Norwegian; Sandnes dialect

Language codes
- ISO 639-3: –
- Glottolog: None

The Sandnes dialect (Bokmål: Sandnes-mål or Sandnesdialekten) is a dialect of Norwegian used in Sandnes.

== Phonology ==
=== Consonants ===
- Between and after vowels, the voiceless plosives /p, t, k/ are realized as voiced [b, d, ɡ].
- /ç/ merges with /ʃ/ into [ʃ].
- /r/ is uvular.

=== Vowels ===
Apart from /ə/, all short vowels have a long equivalent, which has the same quality as the short vowel (excluding the /a–aː/ pair).

Monophthongs of Sandnes-mål, from Ims (2010:14)

Monophthong phonemes
	Front				Central		Back	
	unrounded		rounded		Central		Back	
	short	long	short	long	short	long	short	long
Close	i	iː	y	yː	ʉ	ʉː	u	uː
Mid	e	eː	ø	øː	(ə)		ɔ	ɔː
Open					a	aː		

- The close vowels /i, iː, y, yː, ʉ, ʉː, u, uː/ are rather lax (near-close) [ɪ, ɪː, ʏ, ʏː, ʉ̞, ʉ̞ː, ʊ, ʊː].
- The unrounded–rounded pairs /i–y, iː–yː, e–ø, eː–øː/ have a very similar backness, and differ mainly by rounding.
- /e, eː, ø, øː, ə/ are mid [e̞, e̞ː, ø̞, ø̞ː, ə], whereas /ɔ, ɔː/ are open-mid [ɔ, ɔː].
- /a, aː/ are near-open; the long vowel is central [ɐː], whereas the short vowel is somewhat more front [æ̠].

Diphthong phonemes
Starting point	Ending point		
Starting point	Front		Central
Starting point	unrounded	rounded	rounded
Mid	ei	øy	øʉ

- The components of the diphthongs are phonetically close to the short vowels transcribed with the same symbols, so that /ei/ is phonetically more or less [e̞ɪ], whereas /øy/ and /øʉ/ are phonetically more or less, respectively, [ø̞ʏ] and [ø̞ʉ̞].

== Bibliography ==
- Ims, Charlotte Sol (2010). Sandnes i skyggen av Stavanger - en sociolingvistisk undersøkelse av Sandnes-mål med utgangspunkt i utvalgte språklige variabler (PDF) (Master's thesis). Adger: Universitetet i Adger. Archived from the original (PDF) on 27 September 2015.
