= Oslo dialect =

Dialect of Norwegian

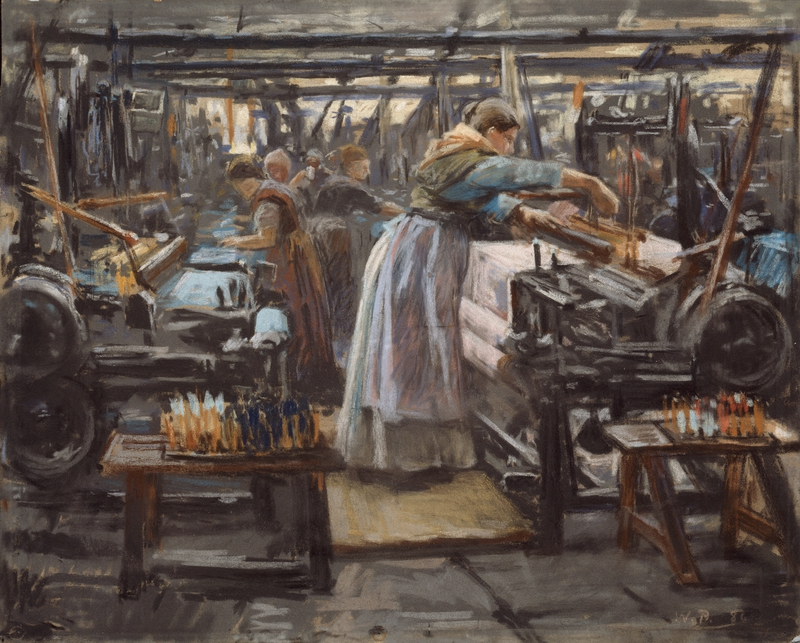
Fra Hjula Veveri (1886) by Wilhelm Peters shows workers at a weaving mill during the end of the 19th century. The Oslo dialect was associated with the working class on the East End of Oslo

Oslo dialect (Norwegian: Vikamål and Østkantmål, translated Vika dialect and East End dialect) is a Norwegian dialect and the traditional dialect of Oslo, Norway. It must not be confused with the current native spoken language of Oslo, Standard East Norwegian. The Oslo dialect has been considered to be an extinct form of Norwegian, but there are surviving fragments of it, especially on the East End of Oslo.

Originally, the Oslo dialect was the dialect of the lower social strata, primarily the workers, farmers and peasants. The dialect is related to nearby East Norwegian dialects. After the industrialization of Oslo (Christiania/Kristiania) at the end of the 19th century, the Oslo dialect was almost exclusively associated with workers and the east end. As a contrast, the upper and middle classes would speak a language more akin to Dano-Norwegian. In the post-war period, much of the industry near the city centre was demolished. This contributed to the decline of the Oslo dialect.

== History ==
The Oslo dialect has since the late 19th century been strongly associated with the East End of Oslo and other working-class areas of the city, but has seen a decline since the post-war period. It existed side-by-side with Dano-Norwegian, the latter being more associated with the upper and middle classes. Workers moving up the social ladder would adopt Dano-Norwegian. Since the end of the 20th century, the Oslo dialect has been in decline due to higher education levels, growth of media, and larger social mobility. This has caused the Oslo dialect to be considered a low-standard language, which is occasionally looked down upon in modern times.

Since the 1970s, the Oslo dialect (in its original form) has practically been considered extinct, although natives of Oslo can show typical influence of the Oslo dialect during informal and casual speech.

Perhaps the most known examples of Oslo dialect in Norwegian are the Olsenbanden movies, set in Norway from the 1950s to the 1970s. The main characters of Benny, Egon and Kjell speak a dialect close to the original Oslo dialect. In recent times, the dialect has been parodied many times, most notably by Harald Eia's character Oslolosen.

== Examples of Oslo dialect ==
Standard Eastern Norwegian dialect in brackets, along with English translation in italics.

- Bjønn (bjørn, bear)
- Bleik (blek, pale)
- Brei (bred, wide)
- Bærj (berg, mountain)
- Bånn (bunn, bottom)
- Brølløp (bryllup, wedding)
- GåL (gård, farm)
- Hævv (haug, hill)
- Hønn (horn, horn)
- Kløppe (klippe, cliff)
- Kjærke (kirke, church)

== See also ==
- East End and West End of Oslo
- Urban East Norwegian
- Norwegian dialects

== Literature ==
- Skjekkeland, Martin, Dei norske dialektane : tradisjonelle særdrag i jamføring med skriftmåla, Kristiansand, Høyskoleforlaget, 1997
- Skjekkeland, Martin, Målføre og skriftmål, Oslo, Universitetsforlaget, 1977
- Austlandsmål i endring : dialektar, nynorsk og språkhaldningar på indre Austlandet, Oslo, Samlaget, 1999
