= Trøndersk =

Central Norwegian dialect

Trøndersk Norwegian
- Pronunciation: /ˈtrøːnˌdɛʂk/
- Region: Trøndelag, Nordmøre, Bindal, Frostviken
- Language family: Indo-European: Germanic; Northwest Germanic; North Germanic; West Scandinavian; Norwegian; Trøndersk Norwegian

Language codes
- ISO 639-3: –
- Glottolog: trnd1234

Trøndersk (Urban East Norwegian: [ˈtrœ̀ndəʂk]), also known as trøndermål (Urban East Norwegian: [ˈtrœ̀ndərmoːɫ]) or trøndsk (Urban East Norwegian: [ˈtrœndsk]), is a Norwegian dialect, or rather a group of several sub-dialects. As is the case with all Norwegian dialects, it has no standardised orthography, and its users write either Bokmål or Nynorsk.

It is spoken in Trøndelag county, the Nordmøre district in Møre og Romsdal county, and in Bindal Municipality in Nordland county in Norway as well as in Frostviken in northern Jämtland in Sweden, which was colonized in the 18th century by settlers from Nord-Trøndelag and transferred to Sweden as late as 1751. The dialect is, among other things, perhaps mostly characterized by the use of apocope, palatalization and the use of voiced retroflex flaps (thick L). Historically it also applied to contiguous regions of Jämtland and Härjedalen.

The word trøndersk is an adjective describing a Trønder (a person from Trøndelag) or anything coming from or relating to Trøndelag (including the dialect).

Some of the more conspicuous variations of these dialects of Norwegian, in addition to the aforementioned apocope and palatalization, are that most of the personal pronouns are pronounced differently than in Standard Norwegian, e.g. Trondheim dialect: 1st person singular nominative /æː/, commonly rendered as "æ" (Standard Norwegian "eg" (Nynorsk) / "jeg" (Bokmål)), or 2nd person plural accusative /dɔkː/ or /dɔkːɛr/, commonly spelled "dokker" or "dåkker" (Standard Norwegian "de/dokker" (Nynorsk) / "dere" (Bokmål)). Variation among personal pronouns is common in most Norwegian dialects. The 1st person singular has a particularly high variability in the Trønder dialects.

== Phonology ==
Trøndersk features phonemic pitch accent in monosyllabic words, namely those that were disyllabic in Old Norse but later became monosyllabic due to apocope. This creates minimal pairs not found in most other varieties of Norwegian. In dialects with the dative case, an example of that would be the difference between the dative form of a neuter noun as compared with the nominative form. The latter is pronounced with Tone 1, whereas the former often has Tone 2. Outsiders are rarely able to hear the distinction between them as in most other varieties of Norwegian (and Swedish) pitch accent is phonemic only in non-final syllables of polysyllabic words.

The Meldal subdialect has a distinctive realization of /i/ that is retracted to [ɨ].

In the subdialect of the traditional district of Namdalen, Old Norse /aː/ is often realized as a wide diphthong [ɑu]. This is also the case in the interior dialect Sogn, as well as in Jamtlandic, the dialect of Voss, and the Icelandic language.

== Comparisons to other languages ==
Trøndersk	Norwegian(Nynorsk)	Norwegian(Bokmål)	English	High German	Swedish	Icelandic
ka, kå, ke	kva	hva	what	was	vad	hvað
kæmm, k(v)enn, k(v)ann, kånn	kven, (kveim)	hvem	who	wer	vem	hver
kålles, kess, koss, koss’n, kors’n (kossj’n), kordan	korleis, hosse(n)	hvordan	how	wie	hur	hvernig
æ, æg, i, e, eg, ej, je, jæ	eg	jeg	I	ich	jag	ég

== See also ==
- Jämtland dialects

== Bibliography ==
- Jenstad, Tor Erik; Dalen, Arnold, eds. (2002), Trønderordboka, Trondheim, ISBN 82-519-1711-5
