= Stavangersk =

Dialect of Norwegian used in Stavanger

- Pronunciation: Urban East Norwegian: [staˈvǎŋəʁsk]
- Region: Stavanger
- Language family: Indo-European: Germanic; Northwest Germanic; North Germanic; West Scandinavian; Norwegian; Stavangersk

Language codes
- ISO 639-3: –
- Glottolog: None

Stavangersk, Stavanger dialect or Stavanger Norwegian (Norwegian: Stavangersk, Stavanger-dialekt (Bokmål) or Stavangerdialekt (Nynorsk)) is a dialect of Norwegian used in Stavanger.

The pronunciation and origin resemble that of the written Nynorsk, yet the official written language of the Stavanger municipality is Bokmål.

== Phonology ==
=== Consonants ===
- /n, t, d, l/ are alveolar [n, t, d, l].
- As in Bergen and Oslo, younger speakers of the Stavanger dialect tend to merge /ç/ with /ʃ/.
- /r/ is realized as a voiced uvular continuant, either a fricative [ʁ] or an approximant [ʁ̞]. It can be voiceless [χ] before a voiceless consonant or a pause. This means that the dialect does not possess retroflex consonants.

=== Vowels ===
- The long close central /ʉː/ and close back /uː/ vowels can be realized as closing diphthongs [əʉ] and [əu].
- The short counterpart of /ʉː/ is close-mid [ɵ].
- The short close back vowel is more front than in Oslo, near-back [ʊ] rather than back [ʊ̠].
- The mid back vowels are somewhat advanced from the fully back position, i.e. near-back, rather than back. The long /oː/ is close-mid [o̟ː], whereas the short /ɔ/ is open-mid [ɔ̟].
- The long open back vowel is phonetically back [ɑː], but its short counterpart is front [a], identical to the cardinal [a]. It is the most anterior realization of this vowel in Norway.
- The non-native diphthong ⟨ai⟩ has a front starting point [æi].

Diphthong phonemes of Stavangersk
Starting point	Ending point		
Starting point	Front		Central
Starting point	unrounded	rounded	rounded
Mid	ei	øy	øʉ

=== Tonemes ===
==== Phonetic realization ====
Phonetically, the tonemes of the Stavanger dialect are the same as those of Central Standard Swedish; accent 1 is rising-falling, whereas accent 2 is double falling.

== Bibliography ==
- Ims, Charlotte Sol (2010), Sandnes i skyggen av Stavanger - en sociolingvistisk undersøkelse av Sandnes-mål med utgangspunkt i utvalgte språklige variabler (PDF), Adger: Universitetet i Adger
- Kristoffersen, Gjert (2000), The Phonology of Norwegian, Oxford University Press, ISBN 978-0-19-823765-5
- Ophaug, Wencke (2014), EXFAC Fonetikk og fonologi (PDF)
- Vanvik, Arne (1979), Norsk fonetikk, Oslo: Universitetet i Oslo, ISBN 82-990584-0-6
