= Urban East Norwegian =

Norwegian dialect spoken in Oslo

- standard østnorsk
- Pronunciation: Urban East Norwegian: [ˈstɑ̀ndɑr ˈœ̂stnɔʂk]
- Native to: Norway
- Language family: Indo-European: Germanic; North Germanic; East Scandinavian; Danish and Norwegian; Dano-Norwegian; Urban East Norwegian
- Early forms: Old East Norse: Early Old Danish; Late Old Danish; Dano-Norwegian
- Standard forms: Bokmål/Riksmål (written)
- Writing system: Latin (Norwegian alphabet)

Official status
- Official language in: Norway; Nordic Council
- Regulated by: Norwegian Language Council

Language codes
- ISO 639-3: –

Urban East Norwegian, also known as Standard East Norwegian (Bokmål: standard østnorsk, Urban East Norwegian: [ˈstɑ̀ndɑr ˈœ̂stnɔʂk]), is a Norwegian dialect spoken in the cities and among the elites of Eastern Norway, which is today the main spoken language of Oslo, its surrounding metropolitan area and throughout much of Eastern Norway. In Eastern Norway, Urban East Norwegian is generally accepted as the de facto spoken standard of Bokmål/Riksmål.

Urban East Norwegian has linguistic roots in Danish—specifically the Eastern Norwegian elites' pronunciation of Danish (Dano-Norwegian), traditionally known as Educated Norwegian (dannet dagligtale). The traditional linguistic divide between East Scandinavian and West Scandinavian runs right through Eastern Norway, which was partially ruled by Danish kings in the Middle Ages. Additionally, while influenced to a degree by the traditional spoken dialects of Eastern Norway, Urban East Norwegian is strongly influenced by the written Danish language. It is markedly different from the traditional Norwegian dialects in Eastern Norway, including Oslo, with which it has co-existed for centuries. Until the 20th century, Urban East Norwegian was spoken by the educated middle and upper class, while the working class and the farmer population spoke traditional dialects, that came to be seen as working-class sociolects in Oslo. In Oslo and other parts of central Eastern Norway, Urban East Norwegian has largely displaced traditional dialects since the 20th century.

== History ==
The language emerged among foreign city dwellers as a reaction against the Norwegian language. The language is generally a dialect of Danish, which was the language of prestige during the 400 year Danish occupation of Norway. During this period Norway did not have a university, and the Danish rulers inserted staff educated at, e.g., the university at Copenhagen into positions of some significance, particularly in cities, as well as trade privileges to Danish-speaking individuals. The intonation of the South-Eastern variation of this language closely resembles Swedish, which for some, but not all, was a language of prestige during the Swedish occupation in 1814-1905. During this time, the Norwegian language conflict emerged, with the former prestige dialects losing ground to the Norwegian language, i.e., Landsmål.

As of 2000, Urban East Norwegian was the most commonly taught variety of Bokmål to foreign students.

== Phonology ==
The /yː/ vowel varies in rounding between compressed [yː] and protruded [y̫ː]. It can be diphthongized to [yə̯].

== Bibliography ==
- Kristoffersen, Gjert (2000), The Phonology of Norwegian, Oxford University Press, ISBN 978-0-19-823765-5
- Vanvik, Arne (1979), Norsk fonetikk, Oslo: Universitetet i Oslo, ISBN 82-990584-0-6
