= Northwest Germanic =

Proposed subgrouping of Germanic language family

- (proposed)
- Geographic distribution: Northern, Western and Central Europe (Pre-colonial)
- Linguistic classification: Indo-European: Germanic; Northwest Germanic
- Proto-language: Proto-Northwest Germanic
- Subdivisions: North Germanic; West Germanic

Language codes
- Glottolog: nort3152
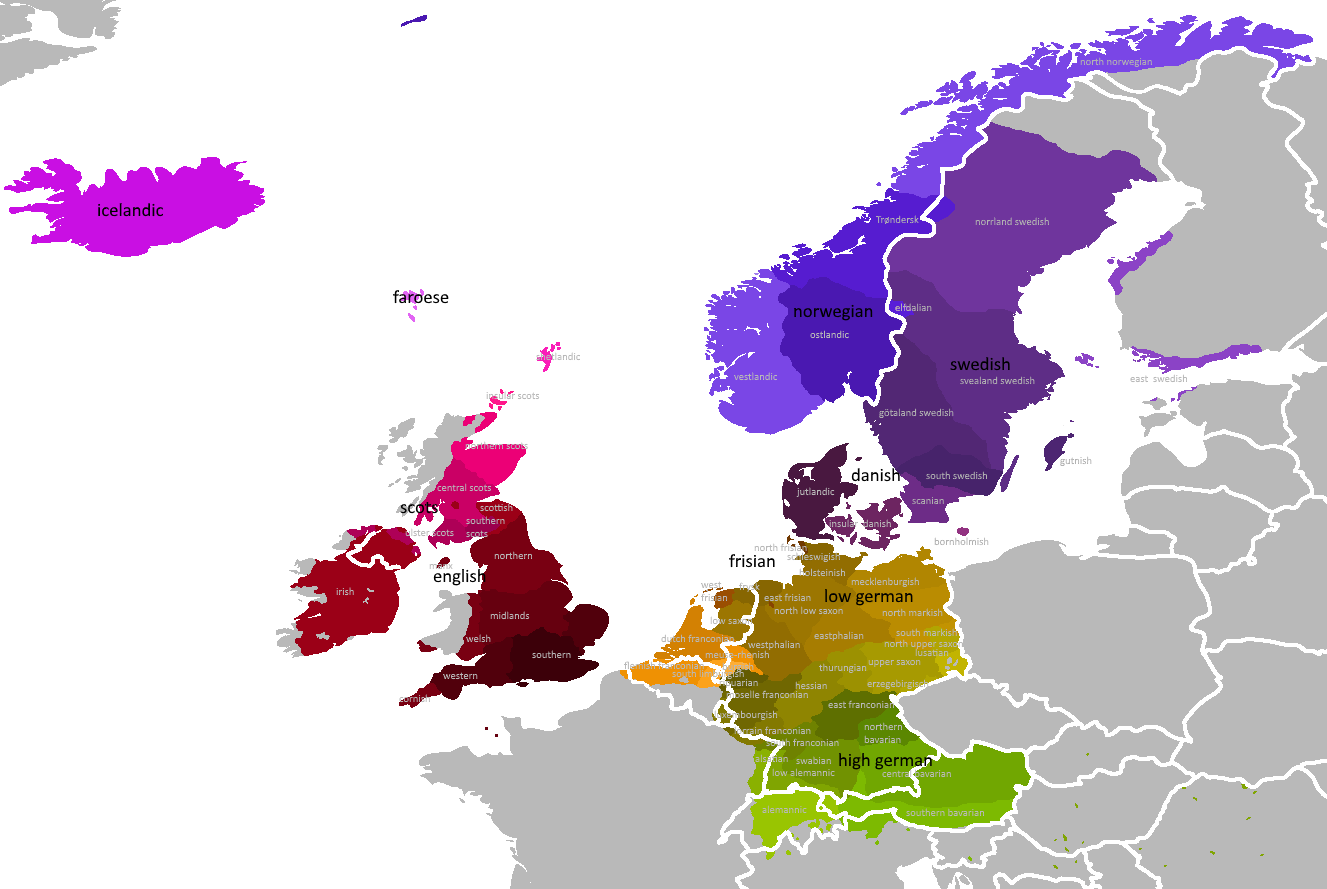
- Modern Northwest Germanic languages in Europe

Northwest Germanic is a proposed grouping of the Germanic languages, representing the current consensus among Germanic historical linguists. It does not challenge the late 19th-century tri-partite division of the Germanic dialects into North Germanic, West Germanic and East Germanic, but proposes additionally that North and West Germanic (i.e. all surviving Germanic languages today) remained as a subgroup after the southward migration of the East Germanic tribes, only splitting into North and West Germanic later. Whether this subgroup constituted a unified proto-language, or simply represents a group of dialects that remained in contact and close geographical proximity, is a matter of debate, but the formulation of Ringe and Taylor probably enjoys widespread support:

There is some evidence that North and West Germanic developed as a single language, Proto–Northwest Germanic, after East Germanic had begun to diverge. However, changes unproblematically datable to the PNWGmc period are few, suggesting that that period of linguistic unity did not last long. On the other hand, there are some indications that North and West Germanic remained in contact, exchanging and thus partly sharing further innovations, after they had begun to diverge, and perhaps even after West Germanic had itself begun to diversify.

— Don Ringe / AnnTaylor, The Development of Old English, p. 10

== History and terminology ==
=== Kuhn (1955) ===
Though not yet using the term "Northwest Germanic", this grouping was proposed by Hans Kuhn in 1955/56 as an alternative to the older view of a Gotho-Nordic versus West Germanic division. Instead, Kuhn used the term ′Spätgemeingermanisch′ (Late Common Germanic):

In dem Zeitraum, da sich dieser [der ostgermanische] Ast vom großen Stamme [des Germanischen] löste, bildete sich die Sprache der Nord- und Westgermanen ebenso wie bisher noch fast ganz einheitlich fort. […]. Die Älteren urnordischen Inschriften enthalten noch kaum etwas, das sie als nordisch und nicht auch vorwestgermanisch verrät, aber dem Gotischen ist ihr Lautstand ferngerückt. Ich habe diese Stufe ‚Spätgemeingermanisch' genannt (Anz. 63, 8). Das Gotische wirkt ihm gegenüber in manchem fast wie vorgermanisch. Dies währte, von einzelnen Sonderungen, die erkennbar werden, abgesehn, bis um die Mitte des 1. Jahrtausends. Erst dann zerbrach diese Einheit.

During the period when this [East Germanic] branch broke away from the main [Germanic] Stamme [trunk], the language of the North and West Germanic peoples continued to develop in a manner that was, as before, almost entirely uniform. [...]. The older Proto-Norse inscriptions contain almost nothing that identifies them as Norse rather than Pre-West Germanic, yet their phonology has already diverged significantly from that of Gothic. I have termed this stage 'Late Common Germanic' (Anz. 63, 8). In comparison, Gothic appears in some respects almost pre-Germanic. This unity persisted, apart from certain peculiarities that become discernible, until around the middle of the 1st millennium. Only then did this unity break down.

— Hans Kuhn, Zur Gliederung der germanischen Sprachen [Apropos: The devision of Germanic langaugaes], p. 45 (= Kuhn 1969, 287)

Erst nach der Mitte des 1. Jahrtausends nach Christus, […], begann, soweit die Runeninschriften erkennen lassen, das Nordische sich mit eigenen Neuerungen spürbar vom Westgermanischen abzuheben.

It was not until after the middle of the first millennium A.D., [...], that, as far as the runic inscriptions indicate, the Nordic language began markedly to silhouette from West Germanic through its own innovations.

— Hans Kuhn, Zur Gliederung der germanischen Sprachen, p. 14 (= Kuhn 1969, 258)

(The older view was represented by mid 20th-century proposals to assume the existence by 250 BC of five general groups to be distinguishable: North Germanic in Southern Scandinavia excluding Jutland; North Sea Germanic along the middle Rhine and Jutland; Rhine-Weser Germanic; Elbe Germanic; and East Germanic. The Northwest Germanic theory challenges these proposals, since it is strongly tied to runic inscriptions dated from AD 200 onwards.)

=== Antonsen (1965) ===
Some years after Kuhn, Elmer H. Antonsen in 1965 proposed the term 'Northwest Germanic':

From the evidence above, it is clear that the vowel systems outlined in Tables 4 and 5 represent a stage of development which, in its entirety, is common to the North and West Germanic languages and foreign to Gothic. It therefore seems appropriate to give this intermediate stage between Proto-Germanic and the later North and West Germanic languages the simple yet clear designation "Northwest Germanic (NwGmc.)". The demarcation of the boundary between Proto-Germanic and Northwest Germanic is then a function of a bundle of isoglosses: (1) the reassignment of [į] > /e/ and of [ẹ] > /i/, (2) the phonemicization of [o] > /o/, (3) the lowering of /ē^{1}/ > /ā/, and (4) the appearance of /ē^{2}/.

— Elmer H. Antonsen, On Defining Stages in Prehistoric Germanic, p. 30

Later Antonsen restricted his these that Northwest Germanic is the predecessor of all the West and North Germanic Languages to these that it is only the predecessor of all the Ingvaeonic (i.e., North Sea Germanic) and North Germanic Languages:

If the archeological datings are approximately correct, it will be seen that EG and WG are distinct from NwG already at 200 A.D., while NwG continues on until approximately 550. This chronology might seem to be a contradiction in terms. It might be argued that if NwG is a parent of (Ingv.) WG, then the two could not coexist from 200–550. Such an assumption is clearly faulty, since it would mean that Dutch no longer exists, since Afrikaans has now become a distinct linguistic entity. NwG underwent a restriction in its geographic distribution after the splitting off of Ingv. WG, but the linguistic features of that part of the NwG area which did not undergo the WG changes remained essentially the same and the language lived on. Therefore, even though Ingv. WG split off by 200 A.D., it is still possible to say that the language of later NwG inscriptions reflect a parent stage of Ingv. WG.

— Elmer H. Antonsen, A Concise Grammar of the Older Runic Inscriptions, p. 27

== Dating ==
Most scholars agree that East Germanic broke up from the rest of the languages in the 2nd or 1st centuries BC. The Runic Inscriptions (being written from the 2nd century) may mean that the north and West broke up in the 2nd and 3rd centuries. The Migration Period started around the 4th and 5th centuries; an event which probably help diversify the Northwest Germanic (maybe even the West Germanic) languages even more. The date by which such a grouping must have dissolved—in that innovations ceased to be shared—is also contentious, though it seems unlikely to have persisted after 500 AD, by which time the Anglo-Saxons had migrated to England and the Elbe Germanic tribes had settled in Southern Germany.

== Shared innovations ==
The evidence for Northwest Germanic is constituted by a range of common linguistic innovations in phonology, morphology, word formation and lexis in North and West Germanic, though in fact there is considerable debate about which innovations are significant. An additional problem is that Gothic, which provides almost the sole evidence of the East Germanic dialects, is attested much earlier than the other Germanic languages, with the exception of a few runic inscriptions. This means that direct comparisons between Gothic and the other Germanic languages are not necessarily good evidence for subgroupings, since the distance in time must also be taken into account.

The following shared innovations, which must have taken place in Proto–Northwest Germanic, can be noted:

- Lowering of stressed *ē to *ā.
- Raising of word-final *-ō to *-ū.
- Shortening of word-final *-ī and *-ū to *-i and *-u.
- Loss of *w between a consonant and unstressed *u.
- Unstressed *ai > *ē and *au > *ō.
- Unstressed *am > *um.
- Unstressed *er > *ar (if not already of Proto-Germanic date).
- *u/*ū > *i/*ī in the second-person pronouns
- 'the development of absolute final bimoric long *-ō# > -u# (the change in quality being contingent upon the fact that there was no short o-vowel)'.

Many common innovations are of post-Proto-Northwest Germanic date, however. These could have spread through an already differentiated dialect continuum, or have been present in latent form and solidified only in the individual dialects.

- ~~In Norse, final *-aiz > -ar in the genitive singular of i-stems.~~
- Germanic a-mutation: stressed *u > *o before a non-close vowel, unless followed by a nasal and consonant. The West Germanic dialects differ in the outcome, with northern ones preserving *u while southern ones often have *o. The Proto-West Germanic situation thus cannot have been uniform, let alone the Proto-Northwest Germanic one.
- Rhotacism: *z > *r. This change postdated the West Germanic loss of word-final *-z, and there are minor differences in the development of *z in West Germanic as well.
- The replacement of reduplication with ablaut in the 7th class of strong verbs. This may have begun in the common history of North and West Germanic, but was not completed by the time of the split.

== Alternative groupings ==
Postulated common innovations in North Germanic and Gothic, which therefore challenge the Northwest Germanic hypothesis, include:

- Proto-Germanic /jj/, /ww/ > /ddj/, /ɡɡw/ (e.g. Gothic triggwa, ON tryggva, OHG triuwe, "loyalty", see Holtzmann's Law)

A minority opinion is able to harmonize these two hypotheses by denying the genetic reality of both Northwest Germanic and Gotho-Nordic, seeing them rather as mere cover terms indicating close areal contacts. (Such areal contacts would have been quite strong among the early Germanic languages, given their close geographic position over a long period of time.) Under such an assumption, an early close relationship between Nordic and Gothic dialects does not exclude a later similar relationship between remaining North and West Germanic groups, once the Gothic migration had started in the 2nd or 3rd century.

There are also common innovations in Old High German and Gothic, which would appear to challenge both the Northwest Germanic and the Gotho-Nordic groupings. However, these are standardly taken to be the result of late areal contacts, based the cultural contacts across the Alps in the 5th and 6th centuries, reflected in the Christian loanwords from Gothic into Old High German.

== Sources ==
- Thorsten Andersson: Nordgermanische Sprachen. In: Reallexikon der Germanischen Altertumskunde. Vol. 21. de Gruyter, Berlin / New York, 2002^{2}, 289–306.
- Thorsten Andersson: Urnordische Sprache. In: ibid. Vol. 31. 2006^{2}, 559–562.
- Elmer H. Antonsen: A Concise Grammar of the Older Runic Inscriptions. Niemeyer, Tübingen 1975.
- Elmer H. Antonsen: On Defining Stages in Prehistoric Germanic, in: Language Vol. 41, No. 1 (Jan. - Mar., 1965), pp. 19 – 36 (https://www.jstor.org/stable/411849).
- Antonsen, Elmar H. (2002). Runes and Germanic Linguistics. Berlin, New York: Mouton. ISBN 3-11017462-6.
- Heinrich Beck: Die germanischen Sprachen der Völkerwanderungszeit, in: Werner Besch / Anne Betten / Oskar Reichmann / Stefan Sonderegger (ed.), Sprachgeschichte. Ein Handbuch zur Geschichte der deutschen Sprache und ihrer Erforschung (Handbooks of Linguistics and Communication Science. Vol 2.1), de Gruyter: Berlin / New York, 1998^{2}, 979 - 993.
- Frederik Hartmann: Germanic Phylogeny. 282p., ISBN 978-0-19-887273-3, Oxford University Press, 2023.
- Einar Haugen: The Scandinavian Languages. An Introduction to their History. Faber & Faber, London 1976.
- Einar Haugen: Scandinavian language structures. A comparative historical survey, Niemeyer, Tübingen, 1982
- Kufner, H F. (1972). "The grouping and separation of the Germanic languages". In van Coetsem, Frans; Kufner, H. F. (eds.). Toward a Grammar of Proto-Germanic. Tübingen: Niemeyer. pp. 71–97. ISBN 3-484-45001-X.
- Hans Kuhn: Kleine Schriften. Aufsätze und Rezensionen aus den Gebieten der germanischen und nordischen Sprach-, Literatur- und Kulturgeschichte. Band 1: Sprachgeschichte, Verskunst, de Gruyter: Berlin, 1969.
- Kuhn, Hans (1955–56). "Zur Gliederung der germanischen Sprachen". Zeitschrift für deutsches Altertum und deutsche Literatur. 86: 1–47. (= Kuhn 1969, 246–290; doi:10.1515/9783110817348.246).
- Hans Kuhn: [Review of: Ernst Schwarz: Goten, Nordgermanen, Angelsachsen. Francke, Bern und Lehnen, München 1951.] In: Anzeiger für deutsches Altertum und deutsche Literatur, S. 45–521 (= Kuhn 1969, 196–204; doi:10.1515/9783110817348.196).
- Edith Marold / Christiane Zimmermann (ed.), Nordwestgermanisch, de Gruyter: Berlin / New York, 1995,

- p. 115 - 123: Hans Frede Nielsen, Methodological Problems in Germanic Dialect Grouping.

- Moulton, William F.; Buccini, Anthony F. (July 25, 2017). "Germanic languages". Encyclopædia Britannica. Encyclopædia Britannica, inc. Retrieved again on 22 March 2026.
- Nielsen, Hans Frede (1989). The Germanic Languages. Origins and Early Dialectal Interrelations. Tuscaloosa, London: University of Alabama. ISBN 0-8173-0423-1.
- Hans Frede Nielsen: The Early Runic Language of Scandinavia. Winter, Heidelberg 2000, ISBN 3-8253-1080-9.
- Ringe, Don; Taylor, Ann (2014). The Development of Old English - A Linguistic History of English. Vol. II. Oxford: Oxford University Press. ISBN 978-0199207848.
- Elmar Seebold: Westgermanische Sprachen. In: Reallexikon der Germanischen Altertumskunde. Band 33. de Gruyter, Berlin / New York 2006^{2}, 530–536.
- Stiles, Patrick V. (2013-01-01). "The Pan-West Germanic Isoglosses and the Subrelationships of West Germanic to Other Branches". NOWELE: North-Western European Language Evolution. 66 (1): 5–38. doi:10.1075/nowele.66.1.02sti. ISSN 0108-8416.
