= Mayonnaise war =

1985 Danish spelling controversy

Mayonnaise War
- Part of the Danish spelling wars
- Mayonnaise on a Danish rugbrød
- Date: June–November 1985
- Location: Denmark
- Outcome: Some orthographic changes postponed

The mayonnaise war (Note: Danish: Majonæsekrigen or mayonnaise-krigen [mɑjoˈneːsˈkʰʁe̝ˀn̩], also known as Retskrivningskrigen i 1985, 'the spelling war in 1985'.) was a Danish controversy in 1985 that concerned the orthographic assimilation of loanwords into the Danish language.

With the finalization of a manuscript for the new edition of Retskrivningsordbogen in the summer of 1985, Dansk Sprognævn's chairman Erik Hansen gave an interview to Ritzaus Bureau about planned spelling changes in the upcoming edition. The planned changes, which were alternative Danified spelling variants of loanwords, quickly drew public backlash, and hundreds of readers' letters, news articles, and editorials were published by Danish media, which led many Danes to believe that Dansk Sprognævn wanted words to be spelled as they were pronounced.

The controversy quickly boiled down to a few variants, ending up only being about the spelling variant majonæse (from mayonnaise). Eventually, the Danish Ministry of Culture and Ministry of Education were involved in the controversy, and after a meeting between them and Dansk Sprognævn, the latter decided to reverse and postpone some of the planned changes in November 1985, although keeping many of the alternatives, including majonæse.

Despite the reversals, the controversy continued, flaring up again in September 1986 as the new edition of Retskrivningsordbogen was released. Meanwhile, majonæse never became common, and with the 2012 edition the variant was removed.

== Background ==
=== Historical background ===
There is a long history of orthographic conflicts (retskrivningskrige, 'spelling wars') in Denmark, dating back to the 17th century. Back then, philologist Peder Syv wanted, among other things, to have loanwords spelled in Danish, e.g., filosof ('philosopher') instead of philosoph, which later bishop Henrik Gerner defended. Since then, two main positions were established: the reform wing, which wanted words to be spelled as they were pronounced, and the tradition wing, which wanted to keep the original spelling of words.

Later on, when official Danish orthography was determined, loanwords were, in principle, to be spelled according to already-established orthographic conventions. As such, loanwords which were previously written quarantaine ('quarantine'), directeur ('director'), and humeur ('mood'), would now be Danified into karantæne, direktør, and humør. The rule was furthermore supported by the Dansk Retskrivningsordbog of 1892, where it decreed that loanwords that were pronounced in Danish should also be written in Danish.

=== Creation of Retskrivningsordbogen ===
In the summer of 1985, Dansk Sprognævn was about to finish a manuscript for the new Retskrivningsordbogen, which was to replace an earlier edition from 1955. Before its finalising, Dansk Sprognævn had had a meeting with the Ministry of Culture in May of that year about an eventual approval of the manuscript from the ministry, as both it and the Ministry of Education had to approve of the manuscript. After the meeting, Dansk Sprognævn wrote to the ministry that the planned changes were not of "principle character" and Dansk Sprognævn therefore did not need to submit the changes to the Ministry of Culture. (Note: This refers to an earlier agreement between Dansk Sprognævn and the Ministry of Culture, in which the former did not need to submit spelling changes of non-principle character to the latter.) The ministry acknowledged Dansk Sprognævn's message in a letter of early June, and Dansk Sprognævn thereby did not need further approval before the manuscript could be published.

=== Ritzaus Bureau interview ===
Also in early June of that summer, Dansk Sprognævn's chairman Erik Hansen gave an interview to Ritzaus Bureau about planned changes in the upcoming edition. In the interview, Hansen gave examples of loanwords that would now be allowed to be written in a Danish variant. This included konjak (from cognac), remulade (from remoulade), and jogurt (from yoghurt); however, this did not mean that these spellings would replace the old, but were introduced as mere alternatives to the original variant.

== Controversy ==
=== Initial reaction ===
Ritzaus Bureau sent the interview via telegraphs, which was reproduced in many daily newspapers' Sunday editions on 9 June. This led to hundreds of readers' letters, news articles, and editorials in the following months about the Danish spelling variants. The controversy quickly boiled down to a few variants, eventually only being about the spelling variant majonæse (from mayonnaise), as this was the change that the media and later politicians were most focused on. The media's reaction and a few culinary words, especially majonæse, led many Danes to believe that Dansk Sprognævn wanted words to be spelled as they were pronounced. Despite many responses from Dansk Sprognævn, the controversy continued, eventually involving the Danish Ministry of Culture and the Ministry of Education.

==== Erik Hansen's "hate-list" ====
Erik Hansen himself responded in the article Tolv ord, der rystede Danmark, making a "hate-list" with 12 of the new spelling variants that were most disliked. Apart from majonæse, words included were risalamande (from ris à l'amande), (Note: Despite being written in French, the word ris à l'amande likely comes from Denmark itself.) vanilje (from vanille, 'vanilla'), and krem (from creme, 'cream') among others.

=== Political involvement ===
Bertel Haarder as Minister of Education in 1985

In the middle of June, Dansk Sprognævn again wrote to the Ministry of Culture because of the controversy and to avoid misunderstandings. Here, they pointed out that the planned changes were relatively few and concerned almost exclusively individual words and not general orthographic conventions, making them of "non-principle character".

Meanwhile, the controversy spread from the media to the Danish Folketing, where Arne Stinus submitted a written question in July to the Minister of Education, Bertel Haarder:

Will the Minister consider intervening in relation to Dansk Sprognævn's planned and, in the media, much-discussed publication of a new Retskrivningsordbog, with a view to preventing the total confusion regarding Danish spelling that seems, in advance, likely to become the most significant result of the planned spelling reform?

With Stinus's question to Haarder, the Ministry of Education now became involved in the controversy. Followingly, the Ministry of Culture requested a report of the planned changes from Dansk Sprognævn, which was delivered in late July. Additionally, a meeting a month later between Dansk Sprognævn, Haarder, and the Minister of Culture, Mimi Jakobsen, gave the former a chance to elaborate on its viewpoints. Nevertheless, both ministers were still concerned with the planned changes, and after the meeting, Dansk Sporgnævn was asked to reevaluate some of the planned changes. Specifically, the reduction of introduced spelling variants with the -ie suffix, such as gymnasie (from gymnasium) and territorie (from territorium, 'territory') was outright rejected by Haarder.

=== Compromise and reversions ===
Subsequently, Dansk Sprognævn discussed the ministers' request, and in September, the former announced in a letter that, in light of the meeting, some parts of the manuscript for the new Retskrivningsordbogen were to be reversed. The most important reversion was that of the spelling variants with the -ie suffix, which were now postponed to a later edition, reducing the number of spelling variants to about 70. Furthermore, mere orthographic variants that are only spelled differently and not pronounced differently were also reversed, e.g., hefte (from hæfte, 'booklet'). The ministers welcomed the reversions, which both ministers found satisfactory.

In an internal meeting in Dansk Sprognævn in October 1985, the total number of planned spelling variants was agreed to be reduced by about 115. Apart from the 70 words with the -ie suffix, the remaining 45 reductions were also loanwords, with some of them retaining the original variant, including bluff, (Note: The Danish spelling variant bluf was nonetheless introduced as a variant in 2001.) bejdse, 'wood stain', and markis, 'marquess'. However, in other cases, the planned Danish variants became the only acceptable ones, including krebinet (from crepinette) and spontanitet (from spontaneitet, 'spontaneous'). Despite these changes, Dansk Sprognævn kept most of the Danified variants as alternatives to the original, including majonæse and other controversial variants from Erik Hansen's "hate-list".

Dansk Sprognævn's final changes were sent to Mimi Jakobsen and Bertel Haarder on 13 November, and on 22 November Dansk Sprognævn received a telegraphic message, in which the two ministers, after discussing the controversies, had decided not to involve themselves further.

== Aftermath ==
Meanwhile, despite the mayonnaise war having been officially ended in November 1985, the controversy continued in Danish media for some time, flaring up again in September 1986, as the new edition of Retskrivningsordbogen was released, which included the planned changes of Dansk Sprognævn, with a few exceptions.

=== 2001 edition ===
With the 2001 edition of Retskrivningsordbogen, some variants from the "hate-list" were scrapped, including konjak, krem, and paj (from pie); however, the Danish variant vanilje replaced the original vanille.

=== 2012 edition ===
In 2012, the fourth edition of Retskrivningsordbogen was published and included the Danish spelling variants of words with the -ium suffix as official spelling variants, despite being removed from the 1986 edition as a result of the mayonnaise war.

==== Abolishment of majonæse ====
On the contrary, the spelling variant majonæse was abolished, as it never became common. Dano-German linguist Sabine Kirchmeier explains the abolishment:

The Danes didn't like it. Apparently, it doesn't look appetizing when spelled with a j and æ. When it has been used over the years, it has mostly been because some people wanted to criticize the spelling. Now it's out, and mayonnaise is the only valid spelling ...

Data support this analysis: in 2010, Jørgen Nørby Jensen from Dansk Sprognævn noted that the original French variant mayonnaise was used 8/10 times in daily mails. Furthermore, a search on the linguist corpus KorpusDK shows that mayonnaise (including the common misspelling mayonaise) is preferred 9/10 times. Additionally, when Henrik Selsøe Sørensen from the University of Copenhagen investigated the use of different spelling variants on Google, he concluded that 84% wrote mayonnaise when searching, while 14% used misspellings including mayonaise, mayonæse, and majonaise. Only 4% wrote the Danified majonæse.

== See also ==
- Norwegian language conflict – Controversy between varieties of the Norwegian language
- Peder Syv – Danish philologist, folklorist and priest

== Notes and citations ==
=== References ===
- Jacobsen, Henrik Galberg [in Danish] (3 September 2010). "Majonæsekrigen 25 år" [The Mayonnaise War 25 Years] (PDF). Nyt fra Sprognævnet (in Danish). Dansk Sprognævn. ISSN 0550-7332.
- Jensen, Jørgen Nørby (2021-03-29). "majonæsekrigen" [The Mayonnaise War]. Lex.dk (in Danish).
- Nielsen, Hanne Fall (2012-10-31). "Ud med majonæse - ind med bællevin" [Out with majonæse - in with bællevin]. Jyllands-Posten.
