= Danish and Norwegian alphabet =

Latin alphabet consisting of 29 letters

The Danish and Norwegian alphabet is the set of symbols, forming a variant of the Latin alphabet, used for writing the Danish and Norwegian languages. It has consisted of the following 29 letters since 1917 (Norwegian) and 1948 (Danish):

Majuscule forms (also called uppercase or capital letters)
A	B	C	D	E	F	G	H	I	J	K	L	M	N	O	P	Q	R	S	T	U	V	W	X	Y	Z	Æ	Ø	Å
Minuscule forms (also called lowercase or small letters)
a	b	c	d	e	f	g	h	i	j	k	l	m	n	o	p	q	r	s	t	u	v	w	x	y	z	æ	ø	å

The letters ⟨c⟩, ⟨q⟩, ⟨w⟩, ⟨x⟩ and ⟨z⟩ are not used in the spelling of indigenous words. They are rarely used in Norwegian, where loan words routinely have their orthography adapted to the native sound system using ⟨k⟩, ⟨s⟩, and ⟨v⟩. Conversely, Danish has a greater tendency to preserve loan words' original spellings. In particular, a ⟨c⟩ that represents /s/ is almost never normalized to ⟨s⟩ in Danish, as would most often happen in Norwegian. Many words originally derived from Latin roots retain ⟨c⟩ in their Danish spelling, for example Norwegian sentrum vs Danish centrum.

The "foreign" letters also sometimes appear in the spelling of otherwise-indigenous family names. For example, many of the Danish families that use the surname Skov (meaning 'forest') spell it Schou.

The difference between the Dano-Norwegian and the Swedish alphabet is that Swedish uses the variant ⟨ä⟩ instead of ⟨æ⟩, and the variant ⟨ö⟩ instead of ⟨ø⟩, similarly to German. Also, the collating order for these three letters is different in Swedish: Å, Ä, Ö. ⟨æ⟩ and ⟨ä⟩ are sorted together in all Scandinavian languages, as well as Finnish, and so are ⟨ø⟩ and ⟨ö⟩.

== Letters and their names ==
The Danish alphabet read by a Dane.

The Norwegian alphabet read by a Norwegian.

The below pronunciations of the names of the letters do not necessarily represent how the letters are used to represent sounds. The list includes the number of each letter when following official ordering.

Letter		Number	Danish name	Norwegian name
A	a	1	[ɛˀ]	[ɑː]
B	b	2	[pe̝ˀ]	[beː]
C	c	3	[se̝ˀ]	[seː]
D	d	4	[te̝ˀ]	[deː]
E	e	5	[e̝ˀ]	[eː]
F	f	6	[ef]	[ɛfː]
G	g	7	[ke̝ˀ]	[ɡeː]
H	h	8	[hɔˀ]	[hoː]
I	i	9	[iˀ]	[iː]
J	j	10	[jʌð]	[jeː] or [jɔdː]
K	k	11	[kʰɔˀ]	[koː]
L	l	12	[el]	[ɛlː]
M	m	13	[em]	[ɛmː]
N	n	14	[en]	[ɛnː]
O	o	15	[oˀ]	[uː]
P	p	16	[pʰe̝ˀ]	[peː]
Q	q	17	[kʰuˀ]	[kʉː]
R	r	18	[ɛɐ̯]	[ærː]
S	s	19	[es]	[ɛsː]
T	t	20	[tsʰe̝ˀ]	[teː]
U	u	21	[uˀ]	[ʉː]
V	v	22	[ve̝ˀ]	[veː]
W	w	23	[tʌpəlve̝ˀ] (Note: i.e. 'double v'.)	[ˈdɔ̀bːl̩tˌveː]
X	x	24	[eks]	[ɛks]
Y	y	25	[yˀ]	[yː]
Z	z	26	[set]	[sɛtː]
Æ	æ	27	[eˀ]	[æː]
Ø	ø	28	[øˀ]	[øː]
Å	å	29	[ɔˀ]	[oː]

The Norwegian alphabet read by a Norwegian, with the three most common pronunciations of R.

== Ordering ==
=== Danish ===
When sorting in alphabetical order in Danish, the numbers provided in the list above is used. Some peculiarities exist, however.

- The digraph ⟨aa⟩ is sorted as if it were ⟨å⟩, in cases where it represents a single vowel sound. This consequently means that it is sorted like two adjacent cases of ⟨a⟩ when it represents two syllables, e.g. as a result of a compound (e.g. klimaanlæg 'air conditioner'). It does not matter which vowel sound is represented, meaning that words like afrikaans 'Afrikaans' and kanaanæer 'Canaanite' should be sorted as if they have an ⟨å⟩ despite not containing any sounds commonly represented by ⟨å⟩. If two entries contain exactly the same letters except ⟨å⟩ and ⟨aa⟩, the form with ⟨å⟩ comes first.
- If two entries only differ in capitalization, but otherwise contain precisely the same letters, the word with capitalization comes first.
- Accents are not taken into account, except when it is the only difference, in which case the form without an accent comes first.
- In foreign proper names, the letters ⟨ä, ö, ü, þ, ð⟩ are sorted as ⟨æ, ø, y, th, d⟩ respectively. In the case of a Danish vs. non-Danish letter being the only difference in the names, the name with a Danish letter comes first.
- For expressions of multiple words (e.g. a cappella), one can choose between ignoring the space or sorting the space, the lack of any letter, first.

== Diacritics ==
=== Danish ===
Danish orthography has no compulsory diacritics, but allows the use of an acute accent (accent aigu) for disambiguation. Most often, an accent on ⟨e⟩ marks a stressed syllable in one of a pair of homographs that have different stresses, for example en dreng 'a boy' versus én dreng 'one boy', or alle 'all, every, everyone' versus allé 'avenue'. Less often, any vowel including ⟨å⟩ (where it is however recommended to avoid diacritics) may be accented to indicate stress on the word, as this can disambiguate the meaning of the sentence or ease the reading otherwise. For example: jeg stód op 'I was standing' versus jeg stod óp 'I got out of bed' (i.e. unit accentuation). Alternatively, some of these distinctions can be made using typographical emphasis (italics, underlining). The Retskrivningsordbogen dictionary explicitly allows the use of further diacritics when quoting names from other languages. This also means that the ring above ⟨å⟩ and the strike through ⟨ø⟩ are not regarded as diacritics, as these are separate letters.

=== Norwegian ===
Nynorsk uses several letters with diacritic signs: ⟨é⟩, ⟨è⟩, ⟨ê⟩, ⟨ó⟩, ⟨ò⟩, ⟨ô⟩, and ⟨ù⟩. The diacritic signs are not compulsory, but can be added to clarify the meaning of words (homonyms) that would otherwise be identical. One example is ein gut ("a boy") versus éin gut ("one boy"). Loanwords may be spelled with other diacritics, most notably ⟨ü⟩, ⟨á⟩, ⟨à⟩ and ⟨é⟩, following the conventions of the original language. The Norwegian vowels ⟨æ⟩, ⟨ø⟩ and ⟨å⟩ never take diacritics.

Bokmål is mostly spelled without diacritic signs. The only exception is one word of Norwegian origin, namely fôr, to be distinguished from for (see below) as well as any subsequent compound words, eg kåpefôr (coat lining) and dyrefôr (animal feed). There are also a small number of words in Norwegian which use the acute accent. The words are allé (avenue), diaré (diarrhea), kafé (cafe), idé (idea), entré (entrance), komité (committee), kupé (compartment), moské (mosque), supé (supper), trofé (trophy) and diskré (discreet). An acute accent can also be used to differentiate en/ei (a) from én/éi (one) eg. én gutt (one boy) en gutt (a boy).

The diacritic signs in use include the acute accent, grave accent and the circumflex. A common example of how the diacritics change the meaning of a word, is for:

- for (preposition. for or to), pronounced [ˈfɔrː]
- fór (verb. went, in the sense left), pronounced [ˈfuːr]
- fòr (noun. furrow, only Nynorsk), pronounced [ˈfɔːr]
- fôr (noun. fodder), pronounced [ˈfuːr], the circumflex indicating the elision of the edh from the Norse spelling (foðr → fôr; veðr → vêr)
- fôr (noun lining, as in a garment)

Also used is the cedille, but only on a ⟨c⟩ in loanwords, when pronounced like ⟨s⟩.

- Françoise
- provençalsk
- Curaçao

== History ==
The letter ⟨å⟩ was introduced in Norwegian in 1917, replacing ⟨aa⟩. The new letter came from the Swedish alphabet, where it has been in official use since the 16th century. Similarly, the letter ⟨å⟩ was introduced in Danish in 1948, but the final decision on its place in the alphabet was not made. The initial proposal was to place it first, before ⟨a⟩. Its place as the last letter of the alphabet, as in Norwegian, was decided in 1955. The former digraph ⟨aa⟩ still occurs in personal names, and in Danish geographical names. In Norway, geographical names tend to follow the current orthography, meaning that the letter ⟨å⟩ will be used. Family names may not follow modern orthography, and therefore retain the digraph ⟨aa⟩ where ⟨å⟩ would be used today. ⟨aa⟩ remains in use as a transliteration, if the letter is not available for technical reasons. ⟨aa⟩ is treated like ⟨å⟩ in alphabetical sorting, not like two adjacent letters ⟨a⟩, meaning that while ⟨a⟩ is the first letter of the alphabet, ⟨aa⟩ is the last. In Norwegian (but not in Danish), this rule does not apply to non-Scandinavian names, so a modern atlas would list the German city of Aachen under ⟨a⟩, but list the Danish town of Aabenraa under ⟨å⟩. In Danish, the ⟨aa⟩ rule is applied, as long as it denotes one sound, for example German Aachen or Dutch kraal, but if it denotes 2 sounds like in ekstraarbejde (extra work), the two ⟨a⟩s are sorted as two.

In current Danish and Norwegian, ⟨w⟩ is recognized as a separate letter from ⟨v⟩. In Danish, the transition was made in 1980; before that, the ⟨w⟩ was merely considered to be a variation of the letter ⟨v⟩ and words using it were sometimes alphabetized accordingly (e.g., Wandel, Vandstad, Wanscher, Varberg in Dansk Biografisk Leksikon, 1904). The Danish version of the Alphabet song still states that the alphabet has 28 letters; the last line reads otte-og-tyve skal der stå ("that makes twenty-eight"). However, today, the letter ⟨w⟩ is considered an official letter.

== Computing standards ==
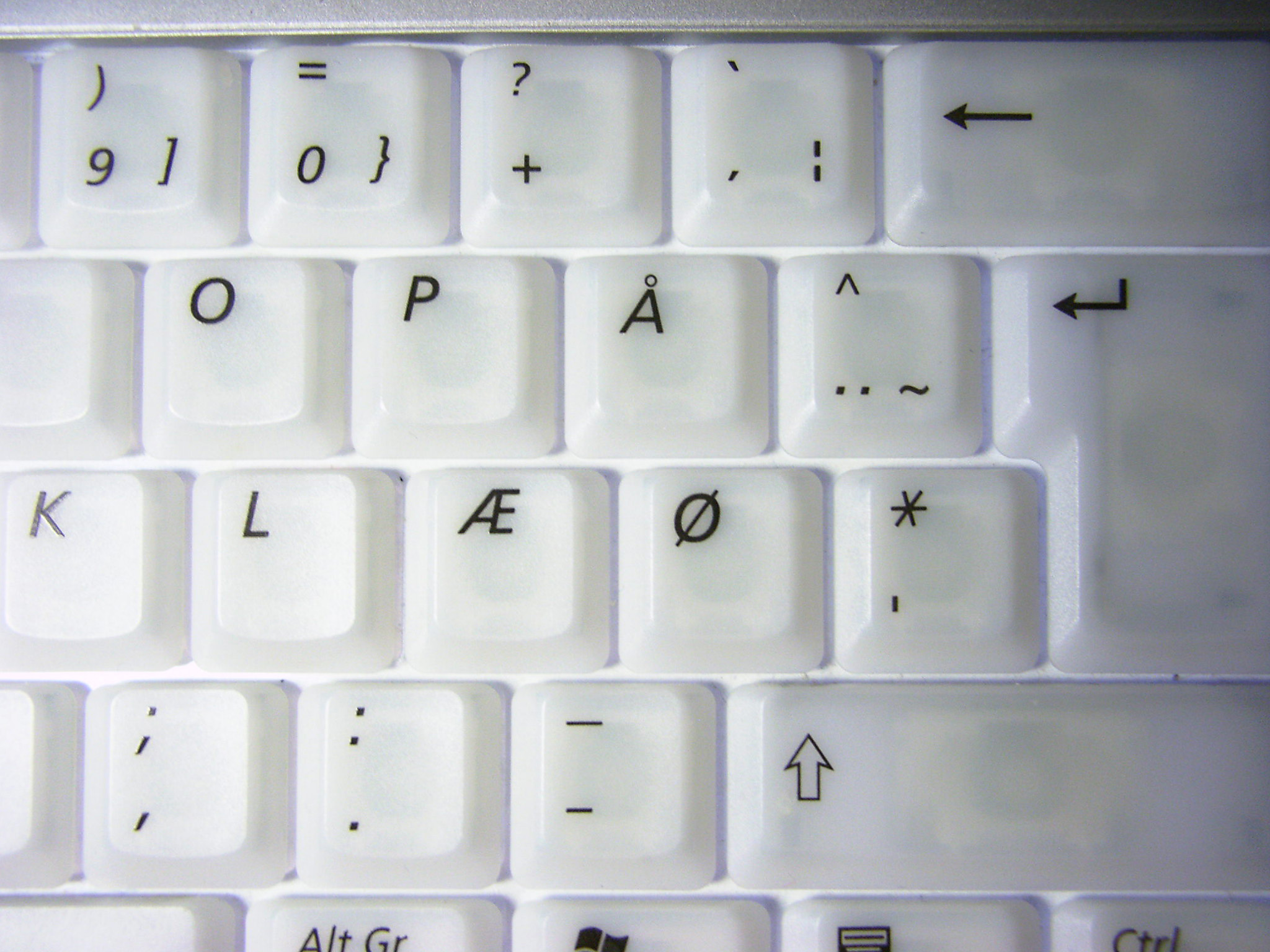
Danish keyboard with ⟨æ⟩, ⟨ø⟩ and ⟨å⟩.

Norwegian keyboard with ⟨æ⟩, ⟨ø⟩ and ⟨å⟩ in places corresponding to the equivalent ⟨ä⟩, ⟨ö⟩ and ⟨å⟩ on a Swedish keyboard.

In computing, several different coding standards have existed for this alphabet:

- DS 2089 (Danish) and NS 4551-1 (Norwegian), later established in international standard ISO 646
- IBM PC code page 865
- ISO 8859-1
- Unicode

== See also ==
- Danish orthography
- Danish Braille
- Danish phonology
- Futhark, the Germanic runes used formerly
- Icelandic orthography
- Norwegian Braille
- Norwegian orthography
- Norwegian phonology
- Spelling alphabet#Latin alphabets
- Swedish alphabet
- Swedish Braille
- Swedish orthography
