= Sabine Kirchmeier =

German-Danish linguist and politician

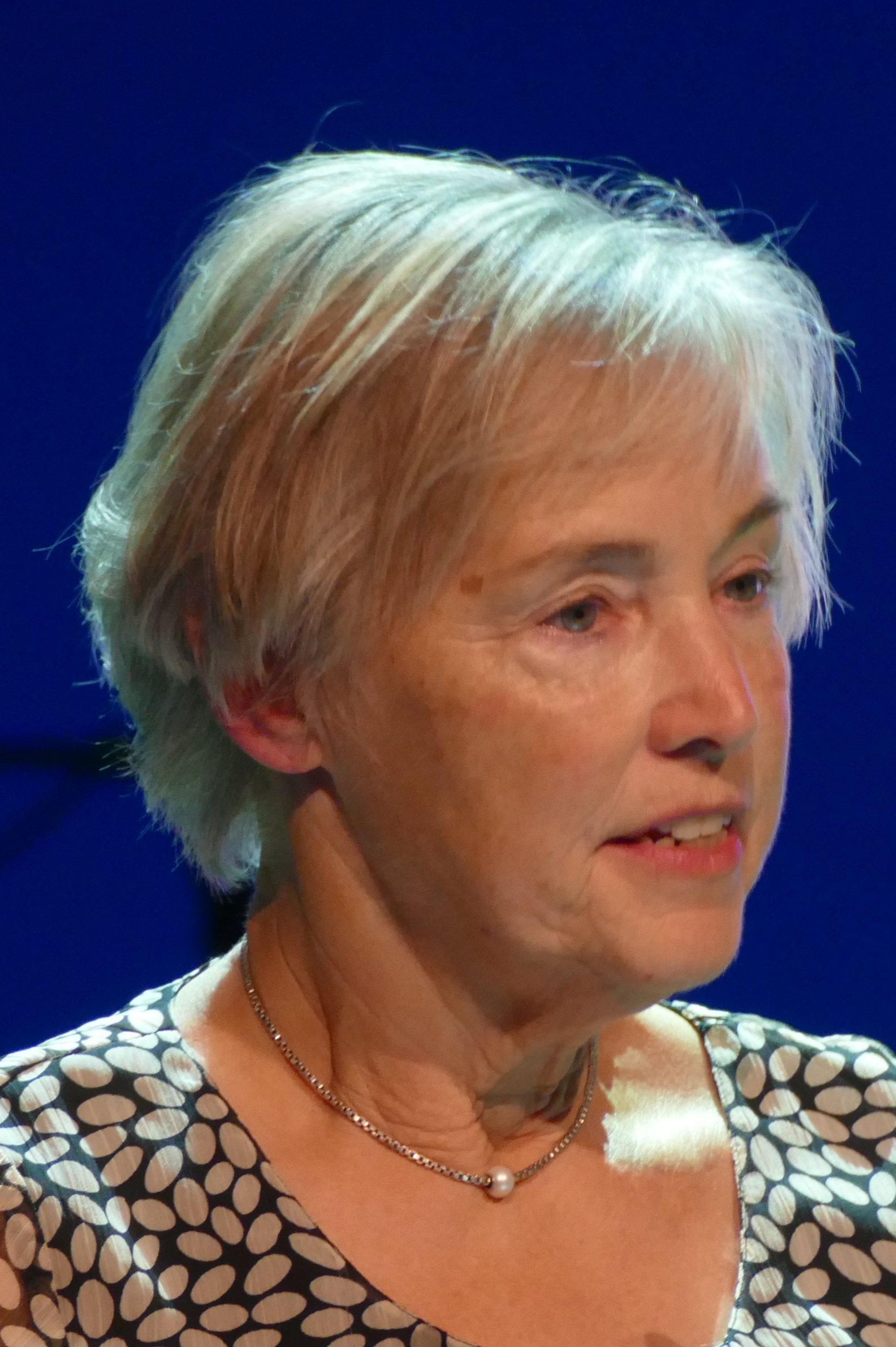
Sabine Kirchmeier in October 2023.

Sabine Berta Luise Kirchmeier (born 3 October 1955) is a German-Danish linguist and former politician. As a researcher, she has worked on computational linguistics and was the director of the Danish Language Council from 2006 to 2019. As a politician, she represented the Social Democrats in Farum from 2000 to 2006, while the cases against Peter Brixtofte took place.

She previously went by the last name Kirchmeier-Andersen.

== Early life and education ==
Sabine Kirchmeier was born on 3 October 1955 in Hanover to German parents. When she was 9 years old, the family moved to Denmark when her father became the director of Dr. Oetker's Scandinavian division. In Denmark, she went to Sankt Petri Schule in Copenhagen and then studied for one year at Ballerup Gymnasium before the family returned to Germany, after Dr. Oetker closed their office in Copenhagen. In Germany, she finished her secondary education at the Ceciliengymnasium in Bielefeld in 1976.

After this, she went back to Denmark and enrolled at the University of Copenhagen in 1977. During her studies, she worked at a factory and as a teacher at the Sankt Petri Schule. She received Danish citizenship in 1980 and finished her cand.mag. degree in Danish and German in 1987. Her master's thesis was about the perception of death in Danish funeral sermons in the 1600s.

== Research career ==
From 1987 to 1992, Kirchmeier was a project leader and researcher in the Danish section of Eurotra. From 1992, she worked towards a PhD and occasionally worked as a consultant for clients such as Price Waterhouse Coopers and Gads Forlag. From 1995 to 1998, she was assistant professor at Copenhagen Business School. In 1997, she finished her PhD at Odense University with the thesis Lexicon, Valency and the Pronominal Approach. She also has an MBA in management. Afterwards, Kirchmeier was hired as associate professor in computational linguistics at Copenhagen Business School in 1998 and until 2006. At certain parts of this period, she was the institute leader and study leader at the Institute of Data Linguistics.

In 2006, she became the first director of the Danish Language Council, and was thus part of the work leading to the 2012 edition of Retskrivningsordbogen. In 2015, this position was extended. The same year, a Festschrift was published on her 60th birthday. She quit as director in 2019 due to the relocation of the Danish Language Council from Copenhagen to Bogense as part of the political decision to move several state organizations out of the capital.

Since then, Kirchmeier has worked as an independent consultant in language technology. Since 2021, she has been the president of the European Federation of National Institutions for Language (EFNIL), whose committee she was a member of from 2006 and vice president of from 2019 to 2021.

== Political career ==
Sabine Kirchmeier became a member of the Social Democrats in Farum in 1994 while she was pregnant, since she wanted to influence her child's future. She then became a member and secretary of the local committee and campaigned against reductions in day care institutions. She was a candidate in the 1997 Danish local elections and became the second substitute in Farum Municipality. In 2000, she became a member of Farum's municipal council, where she was the leader of the social democratic group from 2001 to 2006. She was the lead candidate for the Social Democrats in Farum in the 2001 Danish local elections.

As a municipal council member, she was an early critic of mayor Peter Brixtofte's economic management and she was the opposition leader when the scandal surrounding him was publicized. She was one of the sources cited by B.T. during the Brixtofte scandal. She also reported Brixtofte to the police for breaking the law on municipalities in February 2002, and for fraud in May 2002.

In the 2005 Danish local elections, she received the second-most votes in Farum Municipality, which was scheduled to merge with Værløse Municipality to form Furesø Municipality in 2007, as a result of Strukturreformen. She became a member of the merger committee for Furesø. She might have been able to become mayor in Farum if it had not been merged with Værløse. She resigned from the merger committee in March 2006 to concentrate on her new job as the director of the Danish Language Council, but remained a member of Farum Municipality until the end of 2006 when the merger came into effect. The role as the local lead candidate for the Social Democrats was taken over by Ole Bondo Christensen, who later became mayor.

== Memberships ==
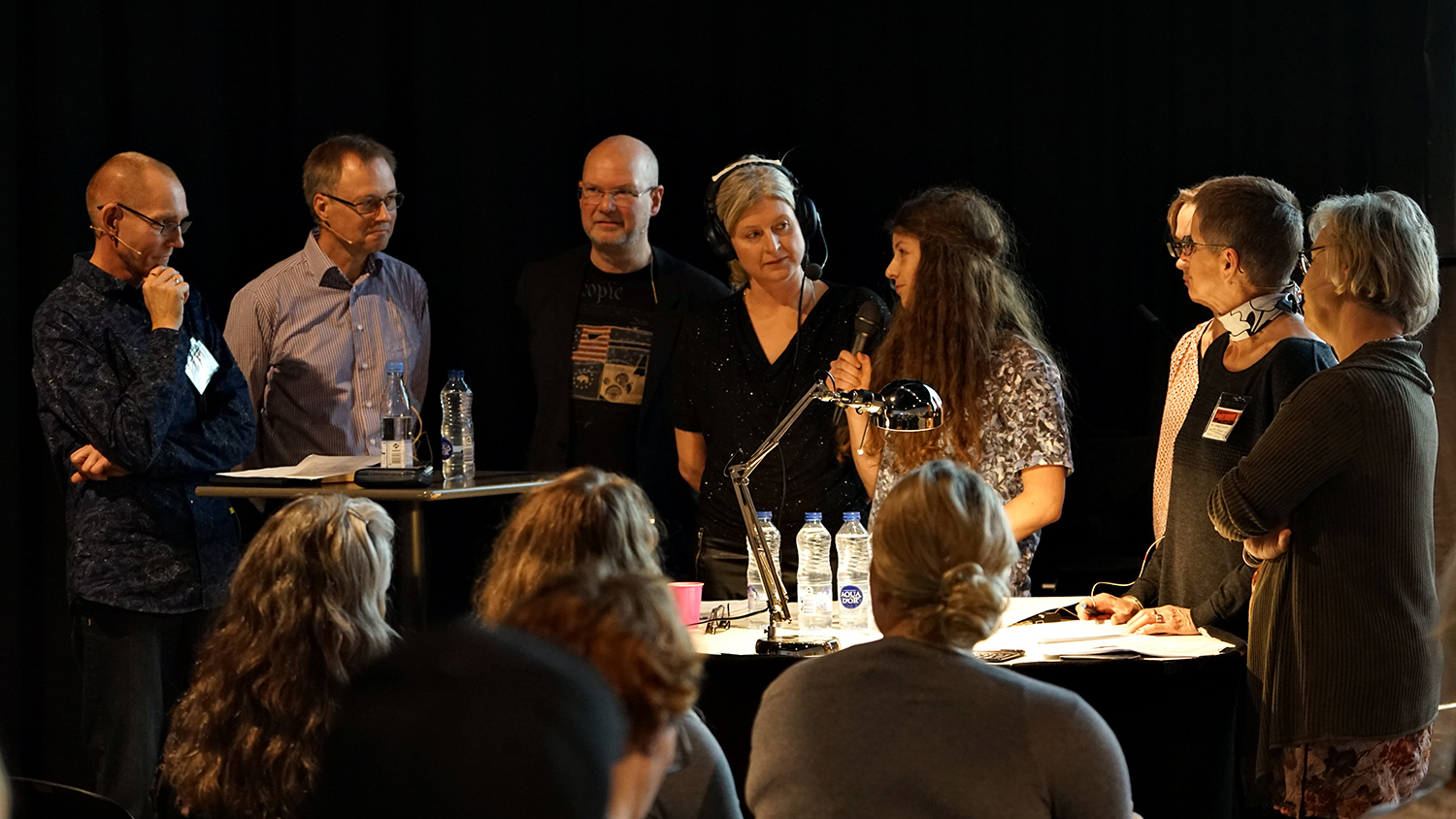
Sabine Kirchmeier standing furthest to the right with other guests at a live episode of the radio programme Sproglaboratoriet in 2015.

Kirchmeier was included in Kraks Blå Bog in 2008. She received Copenhagen Business School's prize for good teaching in 1999. In 2013, she was awarded a knighthood in the Order of the Dannebrog.

From 2007 to 2008, she was a member of the Danish government's language committee, and from 2009 to 2013 she led the Nordic Language Coordination under the Nordic Council of Ministers. Since 2011, she has been a member of the committee for Danske Taler (Danish Speeches).
