= Erik Hansen (linguist) =

Danish linguist (1931–2017)

Erik Hansen (18 September 1931 – 2 September 2017) was a Danish linguist.

He was a professor at the University of Copenhagen from 1975 to 2000 and chaired the Danish Language Council from 1985 to 2002. He was a fellow of the Norwegian Academy of Science and Letters from 1998.

His books include Reklamesprog (1965), Sprogiagttagelse (1967), Ping- og pampersprog (1971), Skrift, Stavning og Retstavning (1981), Rigtigt dansk (1988) and Grammatik over det danske sprog (2011, with Lars Heltoft). In 2001 the Festschrift Sproglige åbninger was issued in his honor, and a collection of his texts were published as Glæden ved grammatik.
