= Dansk Sprognævn =

Regulatory body of the Danish language

Coordinates: 55.6781°N 12.5647°E

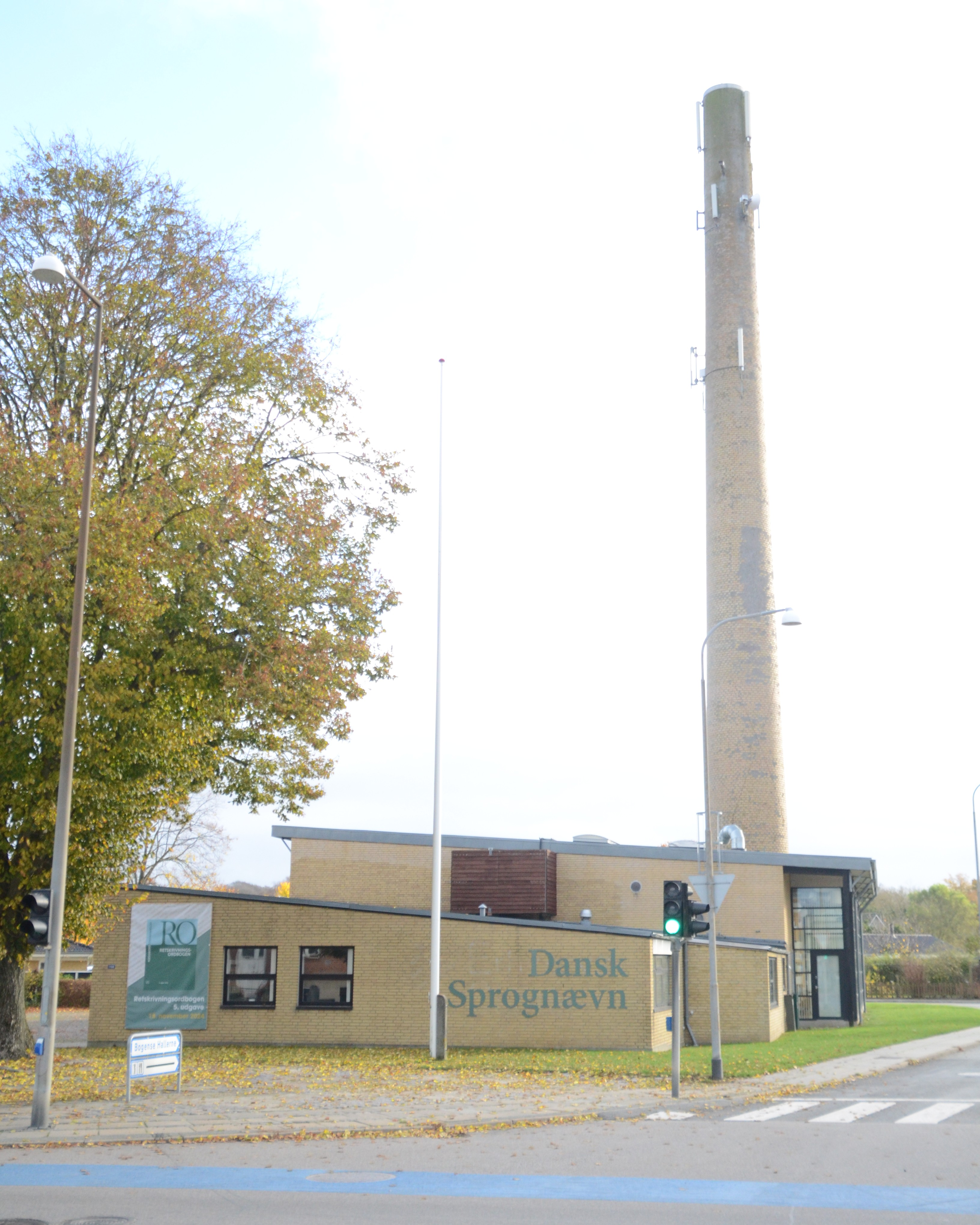
Headquarters of the Danish Language Council in Bogense.

Dansk Sprognævn ([ˌtænˀsk ˈspʁɔwˌnewˀn] transl. Danish Language Council) is the official regulatory body of the Danish language as a part of the Danish Ministry of Culture and is located in Bogense. It was established in 1955. The committee has three main objectives:

- to follow the development of the language
- to answer inquiries about the Danish language and its use
- to update the official Danish dictionary, Retskrivningsordbogen

The working members of the committee follow written and broadcast media, read books to keep track of new words and record their usage. New words which have appeared enough in print and speech to be considered notable are added to Retskrivningsordbogen, which all government institutions and schools are obliged by law to follow. The committee receives some 14,000 inquiries by phone or mail each year about the Danish language, half of them from private companies, but also by private citizens.

Dansk Sprognævn cooperates with its equivalents in the other Scandinavian countries, the Swedish and Norwegian Language Councils, to make sure that the three Mainland Scandinavian languages, which are more or less mutually intelligible, do not diverge more than necessary from one another.

== History ==
Different practices for Danish orthography has been in existence since the language started to be written down. During the last 400 years, this was systematized in descriptions usually written by people with knowledge about the language, some with and without official status. The first case of a state-supported norm was in the case of the Latin school act of 1739. The first official orthographic dictionary was Dansk Haandordbog by Svend Grundtvig from 1872. Different regulations and circulars has been issued since, most important the orthography reform of 1948.

The Danish Language Council was created on March 17th, 1955. Since then, official changes have occurred in a more regular and incremental fashion than before. In 1985, the Danish Language Council became involved in the mayonnaise war.

In 2006, the Danish Language Council went through changes in their organization, in which the position as a director was created, and Sabine Kirchmeier became the first in that position. In 2019, she was succeeded by Thomas Hestbæk Andersen.

== See also ==
- Language policy
