= Comparison of Danish, Norwegian and Swedish =

Comparison of Scandinavian languages

The Scandinavian countries

Danish, Norwegian (including both written forms: Bokmål, the most common standard form; and Nynorsk) and Swedish are all descended from Old Norse, the common ancestor of all North Germanic languages spoken today. Thus, they are closely related, and largely mutually intelligible, particularly in their standard varieties. The largest differences are found in pronunciation and language-specific vocabulary, which may hinder mutual intelligibility to some extent in some dialects. All dialects of Danish, Norwegian and Swedish form a dialect continuum within a wider North Germanic dialect continuum.

== Mutual intelligibility ==
Generally, speakers of the three largest Scandinavian languages (Danish, Norwegian and Swedish) can read each other's languages without great difficulty. The primary obstacles to mutual comprehension are differences in pronunciation. According to a scientific study of the three groups, Norwegians generally understand the other languages the best, while Swedes understand the least.

Danish and Norwegian are especially comprehensible to one another. In general, Danish and Norwegian speakers will be able to understand the other's language after only a little instruction or exposure. Traditionally educated Norwegians, and especially speakers of Urban East Norwegian, understand spoken Danish fluently; indeed Urban East Norwegian is closer to 16th century Danish than modern Danish is due to being closely influenced by the written (Danish) language, which modern spoken Danish has diverged from to a greater degree. However, due to the same reason, present-day Danish speakers generally do not understand spoken Norwegian as well as the extremely similar written norms would lead one to expect. Some Norwegians may also have problems understanding Danish.

Because Norway's largest cities have received signals from Sweden's two national TV channels since the 1960s through private antennas, Norwegians generally have a better grasp of Swedish than vice versa; Sweden did not receive Norwegian TV until decades later.

== Old Norse and Icelandic ==
Old Norse is a stage of development of North Germanic dialects before their final divergence into separate Nordic languages. Old Norse was spoken by inhabitants of Scandinavia and their overseas settlements and chronologically coincides with the Viking Age, the Christianization of Scandinavia and the consolidation of Scandinavian kingdoms from about the 8th to the 15th centuries.

The 12th-century Icelandic Gray Goose Laws state that Swedes, Norwegians, Icelanders, and Danes spoke the same language, dǫnsk tunga ("Danish tongue"; speakers of Old East Norse would have said dansk tunga). Another term was norrœnt mál ("northern speech"). Today Old Norse has developed into the modern North Germanic languages Icelandic, Faroese, Norwegian, Danish, Swedish, and other North Germanic varieties of which Norwegian, Danish and Swedish retain considerable mutual intelligibility while Icelandic remains the closest to Old Norse.

== History of Norwegian ==
In the Kingdom of Denmark–Norway (1536–1814), the official language — in the sense of written language — was Danish, not Norwegian. However it came to be seen as a common language of the kingdoms. The urban Norwegian upper class spoke Dano-Norwegian, a form of Danish with Norwegian pronunciation and other minor local differences. After the two countries separated, Danish remained the official language of Norway — although it was referred to as Norwegian in Norway — and remained largely unchanged until language reforms in the early 20th century led to the standardization of forms more similar to the Norwegian urban and rural vernaculars. Until 1907 the written language in Norway was more or less completely Danish; in the following decades various spelling reforms gradually made the language somewhat more different from Danish, although the differences are still fairly small. Since 1929, this written standard has been known as Bokmål. The other Norwegian written standard, Nynorsk, was constructed on the basis of Norwegian dialects. Attempts to bring Bokmål closer to and eventually merge it with Nynorsk have failed due to widespread resistance during the Norwegian language conflict. As part of this resistance, elites, most of the media and significant parts of the population supported an alternative spelling standard promoted by the Riksmål movement, that built on the Danish language tradition in Norway. The language struggle in Norway also had a class aspect, as the Norwegian educated elites traditionally had a strong affinity for Denmark and its culture, and thus saw the Danish written language as an important part of their identity. Until 1811 the University of Copenhagen had been the only university of Denmark-Norway, and educated Norwegians thus spent formative years in Denmark. When Norway's university was founded in 1811 it built on and maintained close ties to a Danish academic tradition, thereby continuing the influence of Danish among elites. The most recent reforms of Bokmål from 2005 have again brought the language closer to the Danish language tradition in Norway by including most of the Riksmål tradition in official Bokmål, thereby largely ending the Norwegian language conflict.

== Sample text ==
Danish^{1}
I 1877 forlod Brandes København og bosatte sig i Berlin. Hans politiske synspunkter gjorde dog, at Preussen blev ubehagelig for ham at opholde sig i, og han vendte i 1883 tilbage til København, hvor han blev mødt af en helt ny gruppe af forfattere og tænkere, der var ivrige efter at modtage ham som deres leder. Det vigtigste af hans senere arbejder har været hans værk om William Shakespeare, der blev oversat til engelsk af William Archer og med det samme blev anerkendt.

Norwegian (moderate Bokmål)^{1}
I 1877 forlot Brandes København og bosatte seg i Berlin. Hans politiske synspunkter gjorde imidlertid at det ble ubehagelig for ham å oppholde seg i Preussen, og i 1883 vendte han tilbake til København, der han ble møtt av en helt ny gruppe forfattere og tenkere, som var ivrige etter å motta ham som sin leder. Det viktigste av hans senere arbeider er hans verk om William Shakespeare, som ble oversatt til engelsk av William Archer, og som straks ble anerkjent.

Norwegian (Nynorsk)
I 1877 forlet Brandes København og busette seg i Berlin. Dei politiske synspunkta hans gjorde likevel at det vart ubehageleg for han å opphalde seg i Preussen, og i 1883 vende han tilbake til København, der han vart møtt av ei heilt ny gruppe forfattarar og tenkjarar, som var ivrige etter å få han som leiaren sin. Det viktigaste av hans seinare arbeid er verket hans om William Shakespeare, som vart omsett til engelsk av William Archer, og som straks vart anerkjent.

Swedish
År 1877 lämnade Brandes Köpenhamn och bosatte sig i Berlin. Hans politiska åsikter gjorde emellertid det obehagligt för honom att uppehålla sig i Preussen och år 1883 återvände han till Köpenhamn, där han mötte en helt ny grupp av författare och tänkare, som var ivriga att anta honom som sin ledare. Det viktigaste av hans senare arbeten är hans verk om William Shakespeare, som översattes till engelska av William Archer och som med det samma vann erkännande.

English translation
In 1877 Brandes left Copenhagen and took up residence in Berlin. However, his political views made Prussia an uncomfortable place to live, and in 1883 he returned to Copenhagen, where he was met by a completely new group of writers and thinkers, who were eager to accept him as their leader. The most important of his later works is his work about William Shakespeare, which was translated to English by William Archer and received recognition immediately.

1. Excerpts from the articles about Danish critic Georg Brandes from the Danish Wikipedia, version from May 19, 2006, 09:36 and Norwegian (bokmål) Wikipedia, version from April 4, 2006, 01:38. The translation of the Bokmål sample into Nynorsk and Swedish was created for the purpose of this article.

Note on differences between Danish and Norwegian

Note that Norwegian (moderate Bokmål/Riksmål) evolved from a language that was almost completely Danish in 1907. Thus Danish spellings only fell into disuse over a long period in the 20th century. This means that Danish spellings such as "sig" instead of "seg" would still be very familiar to Norwegians, having remained in use by some well into the 20th century and be encountered in many of the most important Norwegian literary works from the early 20th century and earlier. Many differences between the Danish and Norwegian text above would amount to stylistic differences in Norwegian; it is possible to use the word "dog" in the above context in Norwegian, but the word may sound overly formal or old-fashioned to some. Similarly, it is possible to say "med det samme" in Norwegian instead of "straks"; the same is true in Danish, where it's possible to say both "straks" and "med det samme" in the above context.

== Writing system ==
=== Danish and Norwegian ===
Generally, Norwegian orthography is more simplified and regularized and closer to actual pronunciation than Danish. As a rule, the graphic differences between the two languages do not reflect actual differences in pronunciation; while there are significant phonetic and phonological differences, they are rarely expressed in writing. The few exceptions are noted below.

- In writing, Danish may employ either the letter ⟨e⟩ or the letter ⟨æ⟩ to signify the short vowel phoneme /ɛ/. Norwegian almost always uses ⟨e⟩. Example: Danish lægge (to lay), sende (to send) versus Norwegian legge, sende.
- Danish regularly, although not always, uses the letter combinations ⟨nd⟩, ⟨ld⟩ instead of the double consonant letters ⟨nn⟩, ⟨ll⟩. In most cases this is not etymologically justified. In Norwegian and Swedish, only the etymologically justified spellings occur. Example: Danish kende (to know, Old Norse kenna), denne (this /common gender/, ON masculine accusative þenna) and sende (to send, ON senda) versus Norwegian kjenne (Bokmål) / kjenna (Nynorsk), denne (but sende); Danish ilde (bad, ON illa), ville (to want, Old Norse vilja) and holde (to hold, Old Norse halda) versus Norwegian ille, ville (but holde (Bokmål) / halda/halde (Nynorsk)).
- Unlike Norwegian, Danish often uses ⟨ds⟩ instead of double ⟨s⟩. Example: ridse (to scratch) but visse (certain [plural]) versus Norwegian risse, visse. Likewise in some other contexts, Danish bedst (best), sidst (last) versus Norwegian best, sist (ON bezt, sizt, where ⟨z⟩ denoted consonant combinations like ⟨ds⟩ etc.).
- Unlike Norwegian, Danish does not use double consonants at the end of words. Example: Danish vis can signify both the adjective pronounced /viːˀs/ (wise) and the adjective pronounced /ves/ (certain), even though the plural forms of the adjectives, where the consonant occurs medially, are distinguished in writing by means of a double ⟨s⟩ in the second word (vise versus visse). In contrast, Norwegian does distinguish between vis and viss in the same way as between vise and visse.
- Danish preserves the above rule both before inflexional and derivational endings beginning in a consonant and in compounding. Norwegian, too, prohibits word-final double consonants before inflexional endings beginning in a consonant (unless homography needs to be avoided), but not before derivational endings and in compounding. Example: Danish al (all /common gender/) – alt (all /neuter gender/) – alle (all /plural/) – altid (always, literally "all time"); Norwegian all – alt – alle, but alltid.
- Norwegian has preserved the spellings ⟨gj⟩, ⟨kj⟩, and ⟨skj⟩ in the beginning of words when followed by ⟨e⟩, ⟨æ⟩, ⟨ø⟩, while modern Danish has simply ⟨g⟩, ⟨k⟩ and ⟨sk⟩. Today, this in part reflects the fact that these words are also pronounced differently in the two languages, see below. Examples: Danish gemme (keep, hide), kær (dear), skøn (wonderful, lovely) versus Norwegian gjemme (Bokmål), kjær, skjønn.
- A pair of diphthongs are spelled as ⟨ej⟩ and ⟨øj⟩ in Danish, but as ⟨ei⟩ and ⟨øy⟩ in Norwegian. The exact pronunciation of these diphthongs is also somewhat different in the two languages, see below, and the different spellings are phonetically justified at least for the second diphthong. Examples: Danish vej (way), løj (lied /past tense/) versus Norwegian Bokmål vei, løy.
- In the oblique case forms of the 1st and 2nd person pronouns and of reflexive pronouns, the ei/ej diphthong is spelled ⟨ig⟩ in Danish, but ⟨eg⟩ in Norwegian: mig, dig, sig versus meg, deg, seg.
- In Danish, the preposition af "of, from" is spelled with ⟨f⟩ (pronounced [æ] or, in compounds, [ɑw]), whereas Norwegian has av with ⟨v⟩ like Swedish.
- In loanwords, Danish generally has tended to partly preserve the spelling of the source language, whereas Norwegian traditionally usually has adapted the spelling to its own rules in order to reflect the expected pronunciation. Examples: Danish bureau (bureau), chauffør (chauffeur), information (information), garage (garage), centrum (centre), zone (zone) versus Norwegian byrå, sjåfør, informasjon, garasje, sentrum, sone.
- Traditional Danish punctuation requires that a comma be placed before and after every dependent clause, and although two recent reforms permit, optionally, the dropping of a comma before the dependent clause, the old system is still in general use. In contrast, Norwegian only requires a comma after the dependent clause; a comma is placed before it only if the clause is parenthetic (the same rule as in English, but English also does not put a comma after a non-parenthetic clause). Swedish uses the same rule as English: a comma is not required before or after a non-parenthetic clause. Example where the dependent clause is parenthetic – Norwegian: John, som hadde sett mannen, visste hvordan han så ut (English: John, who had seen the man, knew what he looked like). Example sentence with nonparenthetic clause:

Top Level Structure	Subject	Verb		Object					
Top Level Structure				Dependent Clause 1					
Top Level Structure						Dependent Clause 2			
Danish	Jeg	ved	,	hvordan manden	,	(som) du snakker om	,	ser ud	.
Norwegian (Bokmål)	Jeg	vet		hvordan mannen		(som) du snakker om	,	ser ut	.
Norwegian (Nynorsk)	Eg	veit		korleis mannen		(som) du snakkar om (som) du talar om	,	ser ut	.
Swedish	Jag	vet		hur mannen		(som) du snackar om [colloquial] (som) du talar om (som) du pratar om		ser ut	.
English	I	know		how the man		(that) you talk about		looks	.

- Danish capitalizes all words in multi-word proper designations, but Norwegian and Swedish only capitalize the first word: Det Hvide Hus (Danish) – Det hvite hus (Norwegian Bokmål) – Det kvite huset (Norwegian Nynorsk) – Vita huset (Swedish) – the White House (English).

=== Swedish differences ===
Swedish orthography differs from Danish and Norwegian in the following respects:

- Danish and Norwegian use the letters ⟨æ⟩ and ⟨ø⟩, but Swedish uses ⟨ä⟩ and ⟨ö⟩ as equivalents. All the three languages use the letter ⟨å⟩.
- Danish and Norwegian use ⟨kk⟩, but Swedish uses ⟨ck⟩. Danish might also use a single 'k' finally, even for short vowels.
- Swedish uses the letter ⟨x⟩ in native words, but Danish and Norwegian use ⟨ks⟩ instead.
- In Swedish orthography, the etymological ⟨hv⟩ was abolished in 1906. Danish and Bokmål Norwegian still use it, although in some Norwegian words it is simplified to ⟨v⟩ (verv, virvel, veps and optionally in verken/hverken). In Nynorsk, it is written ⟨kv⟩ following truly Norwegian pronunciation.
- Swedish uses ⟨g⟩, ⟨k⟩, ⟨sk⟩ before all front vowels like Danish, although pronounces them as palatals unlike Danish.
- Swedish, like Norwegian, mostly spells /kt/ as ⟨kt⟩, whereas Danish uses ⟨gt⟩'.
- Swedish uses the spelling och (and), whereas Danish and Norwegian use og.
- Use of double consonants in Swedish generally coincides with that in Norwegian, but Norwegian uses ⟨at⟩, ⟨et⟩, ⟨skal⟩, ⟨vil⟩, ⟨til⟩, ⟨mis-⟩, ⟨mann⟩, ⟨menn⟩, ⟨munn⟩, ⟨venn⟩, ⟨inn⟩, ⟨enn⟩ and Swedish uses ⟨att⟩, ⟨ett⟩, ⟨skall⟩, ⟨vill⟩, ⟨till⟩, ⟨miss-⟩, ⟨man⟩, ⟨män⟩, ⟨mun⟩, ⟨vän⟩, ⟨in⟩, ⟨än⟩.
- Swedish uses double consonants before ⟨l⟩, ⟨n⟩, ⟨r⟩, ⟨j⟩, ⟨d⟩, ⟨t⟩, but Norwegian uses single consonants.
- Danish and Norwegian preserve the morphological spelling ⟨-dt⟩, but in Swedish it was replaced by ⟨tt⟩ (or by ⟨t⟩ after consonants and unstressed vowels) by the 1906 spelling reform.
- The use of the letter ⟨ä⟩ in Swedish is much more frequent than the use of ⟨æ⟩ in Danish, not to mention Norwegian. In particular, Swedish uses ⟨ä⟩ in the combination ⟨jä⟩, which mostly corresponds to ⟨je⟩ in Danish.
- Swedish ⟨ts⟩ corresponds to Danish ⟨ds⟩ and Norwegian ⟨s⟩ or ⟨ss⟩.
- Some verbs in Swedish have two infinitives: more commonly used short one and more formal long one: be/bedja, bli/bliva, ge/giva, ha/hava, ta/taga. In Norwegian, only short form is used (except be/bede); written Danish has only long form.
- Spelling of loanwords is intermediate between conservative Danish and progressive Norwegian. In particular, various spelling of ⟨s⟩ and ⟨sj⟩ sounds are usually retained in Swedish, but replaced in Norwegian.
- Danish and Norwegian use ordinal dot for writing ordinal numbers, but Swedish uses colon and ending: 5. (Danish and Norwegian), 5:e (Swedish). Although ordinal dot in Swedish was formerly used, now it occurs only in military contexts, such as 5. komp (5th company). Dates in Swedish are written without the ordinal suffixes, e. g. 5 juni; in Danish and Norwegian the ordinal dot is used: 5. juni.

== Pronunciation and sound system ==
The difference in pronunciation between Norwegian and Danish is much more striking than the difference between Norwegian and Swedish. Although written Bokmål is very similar to Danish, (Note: Nynorsk is arguably more similar to Swedish.) spoken Norwegian more closely resembles Swedish.

Danish pronunciation is typically described as 'softer', which in this case refers mostly to the frequent approximants corresponding to Norwegian, Swedish and historical plosives in some positions in the word (especially the pronunciation of the letters b, d, and g), as well as the German-like realisation of r as a uvular or even pharyngeal approximant in Danish as opposed to the Norwegian alveolar trills or uvular trills/fricatives.

Note that in the following comparison of Danish, Norwegian and Swedish pronunciation, the East Norwegian pronunciation of Oslo is taken as the norm. In practice, most Norwegians will speak a local dialect in most contexts; furthermore, Bokmål itself is not a pronunciation standard, and is likely to be pronounced with clearly regional features. The most obvious instances are the uvular (rather than alveolar) pronunciation of /r/ and the lack of retroflexes in much of Western Norway, and the pronunciation, in some cases, of a retroflex flap instead of /l/ in much of Eastern Norway, including the less "refined" forms of the Oslo dialect. All of this is ignored in the following exposition.

=== Vowels ===
Arguably the most acoustically striking differences in vowels are that:

- In Danish, the grapheme a corresponds, in most contexts, to the pronunciation of a front, often even open-mid front vowel ([æ]), closer to the English short a. In Norwegian and Swedish, a is invariably an open back vowel [ɑ]. Example: Danish bane versus Norwegian bane (course, orbit).
- The grapheme u corresponds to (more or less close) back vowels in Danish, but usually to a close central vowel (/ʉ/) in Norwegian and Swedish. Example: Danish [huːˀs] versus Norwegian [hʉːs].

As a whole, Norwegian and Swedish still preserve the old pairs of short and long vowels, as suggested by the writing system, pretty close to each other, even though the long ones are usually closer. Thus, the grapheme e corresponds to long [eː] (Norwegian and Swedish sene [seːnə], late [plural]) and short [ɛ] (Norwegian sende [sɛnːə], to send; Swedish hetta [ˈhɛ̂ta], heat), while the grapheme i corresponds to long [iː] (Norwegian sine [siːnə], Swedish sina [siːna], his/her/its/their own) and short [ɪ] (sinne [sɪnːə], anger [Norwegian]/mind [Swedish]). In Danish, the tendency of differentiation has led to a qualitative overlapping: also here, e can stand for long [e̝ː] (sene [se̝ːnə], late [plural]) and for short [e] (sende [senə], to send), but i, besides signifying long [iː] (sine [siːnə], his/her/its/their own), has come to correspond to short [e̝] ([nogen]sinde [se̝nə], ever) and, to complicate things further, a short [i] pronunciation is maintained in some cases (sidste [sistə], last). Most Danish vowels have also many segmentally conditioned allophones, especially more open ones when preceded or followed by /r/ .

The following is a table that compares the most common Danish, Norwegian and Swedish pronunciations of a letter (without taking into account the grouping of sounds into phonemes, as well as many sub-rules, exceptions and subtleties). Note that in many cases, even when the same IPA transcription is used, the sounds may still be somewhat different in the three languages.

Grapheme	Quantity	Danish			Norwegian	Swedish
Grapheme	Quantity	/V/	/rV/	/Vr/	Norwegian	Swedish
a	long	[ɛː]	[ʁɑː]	[ɑː]	[ɑː]	[ɑː]
a	short	[æ], [ɑ]^{1)}	[ʁɑ]	[ɑː]	[ɑ]	[a]
e	long	[e̝ː]	[ʁɛː]	[e̝ːɐ, ɛːɐ]	[eː]	[eː]
e	short	[e]	[ʁɑ], [ʁæ] ^{2)3)}	[ɛɐ]	[ɛ] ^{2)}	[ɛ]
e	unstressed	[ə]	[ɐ]	[ɐ]	[ə]	[ɛ]
i	long	[iː]	[ʁiː]	[iːɐ]	[iː]	[iː]
i	short	[e̝], [i]	[ʁe], [ʁi]	[iɐ]	[ɪ]	[i]
o	long	[oː]	[ʁoː]	[oːɐ]	[uː] ^{4)}	[ʊː]
o	short	[ʌ], [ɔ] ^{6)}	[ʁʌ]	[ɒː], [oɐ]	[ɔ] ^{5)}	[ʊ], [ɔ]
u	long	[uː]	[ʁuː > ʁoː]	[uːɐ]	[ʉː]	[ʉː]
u	short	[ɔ] ^{7)}, [u]	[ʁɔ] ^{7)}, [ʁu > ʁo]	[uɐ]	[ʉ], [u]	[ɵ]
y	long	[yː]	[ʁyː]	[yːɐ]	[yː]	[yː]
y	short	[ø] ^{7)}, [y]	[ʁœ] ^{7)}, [ʁy]	[yɐ], [ɶɐ] ^{8)}	[y]	[y]
æ / ä	long	[eː]	[ʁɛː]	[ɛːɐ]	[æː] ^{9)}	[ɛː] ^{11)}
æ / ä	short	[e]	[ʁɑ], [ʁæ] ^{3)}	[ɛɐ]	[æ]	[ɛ] ^{11)}
ø / ö	long	[øː]	[ʁœː]	[øːɐ]	[øː]	[øː]
ø / ö	short	[ø]	[ʁœ], [ʁɶ] ^{10)}	[ɶɐ]	[œ]	[œ]
å	long	[ɔː]	[ʁɔː]	[ɒː]	[oː]	[oː]
å	short	[ʌ]	[ʁʌ]	[ɒː]	[ɔ]	[ɔ]

^{1)} before labials and velars
^{2)} But [æ] before /r/
^{3)} before velars
^{4)} But [oː] before /ɡ, v/
^{5)} but, in some cases, [u] (notably before rt, nd, and sometimes st)
^{6)} in some words before /ʋ/, /s/, /n/, /m/ (< older ō)
^{7)} almost universally before /m, n, ŋ/
^{8)} only in fyrre "40"
^{9)} But [ɛː], when, by exception, not followed by /r/
^{10)} before /n/
^{11)} before /r/ realised as [æː] and [æ], long and short respectively.

While the more open realisations of /ɛ/ and /ɛː/ before /r/ are allophonic in Danish, they have acquired phonemic status as /æ/ and /æː/ in Norwegian, and the Norwegian letter æ has come to be used almost only to signify them. The phonologisation of /æ/ was mostly a collateral effect of the merger of some other sounds: Danish æ /ɛː/ versus e /eː/ and sj /sj/ versus rs /ɐ̯s/ have come to be pronounced in the same way in Norwegian (respectively /eː/ and /ʂ/), thus rendering the occurrences of /æ/ unpredictable.

=== Diphthongs ===
The Danish diphthongs [ɑj] and [ʌw] (spelled as ej and øj) correspond to the Norwegian diphthongs (in Oslo pronunciation) [æɪ̯] and [œʏ̯] (spelled as ei and øy) and to Swedish [ɛj] and [œj] (spelled as ej and öj). Besides that, a great many letter combinations are pronounced as diphthongs in Danish, but as usual vowel-consonant combinations in Norwegian and Swedish. That is mostly due to the Danish letters g and v (colloquially also b) being pronounced as semivowels [j] and [w] after a vowel: thus, dag (day) is pronounced [tɛːˀ(j)] in Danish, but [dɑːɡ] in Norwegian and Swedish; lov (law) is pronounced [lʌw] in Danish, but [loːv] in Norwegian and Swedish. Similarly, [ɑj] and [ʌw] are often spelled as eg and øg in Danish (eg may be pronounced [æɪ̯] in Norwegian, too, e.g. in regne, "to rain"). The Danish pronunciation is therefore, as with a above, closer to English, while the Norwegian and Swedish is more conservative, closer to its spelling.

- A significant sound correspondence (rather than simply a difference in pronunciation) is the fact that Danish and Swedish have long monophthongs (e /eː/, ø /øː/) in some words, where Norwegian has restored the reflexes of old Norse diphthongs (ei [æɪ̯], øy [œʏ̯] and au [æʉ̯]) as alternatives or, sometimes, replacement of the Danish ones. Examples: Danish ben, Swedish ben (leg, bone) – Norwegian ben or bein; Danish hø, Swedish hö (hay) – Norwegian høy; Danish høj, Swedish hög (hill) – Norwegian haug.
- Another correspondence: Old Norse jó and jú became ju in Swedish but y in Danish. Norwegian sometimes uses Danish forms, sometimes forms with jo and ju as in Old Norse. For example: Old Norse ljóss – Danish lys – Norwegian lys (Bokmål), lys or ljos (Nynorsk) – Swedish ljus (light).

=== Consonants ===
The most notable differences are, as already mentioned, the pronunciation of approximants in Danish, corresponding to voiced and voiceless stops in Norwegian and Swedish and of r as a uvu-pharyngeal approximant in Danish, corresponding to an alveolar trill in (East) Norwegian and Swedish (except southern dialects) (skrige, "shriek" versus skrike, skrika). Furthermore, Danish has replaced the voiceless/voiced opposition (in /p, t, k/ versus /b, d, ɡ/) with an aspirated/nonaspirated one ([pʰ, tsʰ, kʰ] versus [p, t, k]), and the contrast between the two is neutralized syllable-finally and before schwa (in practice, in the core of native words, this means it is lost everywhere except word-initially). Thus, begge (both) and bække (brooks) are pronounced alike as [pɛgə]. In Norwegian and Swedish, the opposition is still voiced versus voiceless and it is preserved everywhere, with /p, t, k/ being aspirated in the onset of a stressed syllable (as in English and German).

Letter	Danish			Norwegian		Swedish	
Letter	In stressed onset	Elsewhere (single)	Elsewhere (double)	In stressed onset	Elsewhere	In stressed onset	Elsewhere
v	[v]	[w]	[w]	[ʋ]	[ʋ]	[v]	[v]
b	[p]	[p, w]	[p]	[b]	[b]	[b]	[b]
p	[pʰ]	[p]	[p]	[pʰ]	[p]	[pʰ]	[p]
d	[t]	[ð̠˕ˠ]	[ð̠˕ˠ]	[d]	[d]	[d]	[d]
t	[tsʰ]	[t]	[t]	[tʰ]	[t]	[tʰ]	[t]
g	[k]	[-, j, w]	[k]	[ɡ]	[ɡ]	[ɡ]	[ɡ]
k	[kʰ]	[k]	[k]	[kʰ]	[k]	[kʰ]	[k]
r	[ʁ]	[ɐ̯, -]	[ɐ̯]	[r]	[r]	[r]	[r]

The Danish /r/ is either vocalized or dropped altogether, after having influenced the adjacent vowels, in all positions but word-initially and pre-stress, making the Danish r very similar to the standard German r. Also, note the Danish pronunciation of initial t as [tsʰ], similar to the High German consonant shift wherein German changed t to z/tz (cf. Danish tid, German Zeit).

Meanwhile, syllable-final b, v, d, and g may be compared to English syllables that end in y, w, and th (English "say" versus Danish sige, "law" versus lov, "wrath" versus vrede).

Some letter combinations that are pronounced quite differently are:

- rd, rl, rn, rs, rt are pronounced as spelled in Danish (with the /r/ dropped), but in the part of Norway using trilled r, they are always or almost always merged into retroflex consonants ([ɖ], [ɭ], [ɳ], [ʂ], [ʈ]), as in Swedish.
- sj is pronounced [ɕ] in Danish, but as [ʂ] in most of Norway and as [ɧ] in Swedish.

Some notable sound correspondences are:

- Danish has /b/ (spelled b), /ð/ (spelled d), and [j, w] (spelled g) after long stressed vowels, where Norwegian and Swedish have restored/preserved the /p/, /t/ and /k/ from Old Norse. Examples: Danish fod (foot), reb (rope), syg (sick) – Norwegian fot, rep, syk/sjuk – Swedish fot, rep, sjuk – Old Norse fótr, reip, sjúkr. In a handful of cases, however, Bokmål Norwegian has kept the Danish form (lege, doctor, tegn, sign, bedre, better versus Old Norse læknari, teikn, betri). In most of these cases, the Nynorsk equivalents have retained the old consonants (lækjar (variant form), teikn, betre).
- Sometimes Danish has /v/ ([w], spelled v) after originally long stressed vowels, where Norwegian and Swedish have restored/preserved /ɡ/ from Old Norse. Example: Danish skov (forest), mave (belly) – Norwegian skog, mage – Swedish skog, mage – Old Norse skógr, magi. However, in many cases Norwegian has kept the Danish form (lyve "tell a lie" – Old Norse ljúga), and variation is permitted (mave, lyge, and even ljuge).
- Danish has /ɡ/, /k/, and /sk/ (spelled g, k and sk) in stressed syllable onsets, where Norwegian usually has /j/, /ç/ and /ʂ/ before front vowels (spelled as in Danish before i, y, ei and øy, and gj, kj and skj elsewhere). Examples: Danish gemme (keep, hide), kær (dear), skønt (although), gyse (shiver), kilde (source, spring) versus Norwegian gjemme, kjær, skjønt, gyse, kilde (Bokmål)/kjelde (Bokmål and Nynorsk). Swedish has /j/, /ɕ/ and /ɧ/, spelled as in Danish: gömma, kär, källa.
- Additionally, the letter g is pronounced /j/ in Swedish in the final consonant combinations -lg and -rg, but not in Danish and Norwegian.
- The consonant combinations skj, kj, tj, gj are pronounced simply as consonant clusters in Danish, but in Norwegian and Swedish they represent single consonants: Norwegian skj /ʂ/, kj, tj /ç/, gj /j/; Swedish skj /ɧ/, kj, tj /ɕ/, gj /j/. The combinations dj and stj represent consonant clusters in Danish and Norwegian and the consonants /j/ and /ɧ/ respectively in Swedish. The combination lj is pronounced /j/ in Norwegian and Swedish, not used in Danish (Norwegian ljore – Danish lyre, "hole in the roof"; Swedish ljus – Danish and Norwegian lys [Nynorsk also ljos], "light"). On the other hand, hj is pronounced /j/ in all the three languages.
- The consonant combinations nd and ld are pronounced the same as nn and ll in Danish and Norwegian. In Swedish, they are pronounced as written.

=== Prosody ===
In Norwegian and Swedish, each stressed syllable must contain, phonetically, either a long vowel or a long (geminate) consonant (e.g. male [mɑːlə], "to paint" versus malle [mɑlːə], "catfish") . In Danish, there are no phonologically long consonants, so the opposition is between long and short vowels ([mæːlə] versus [malə]). All the three languages have a prosodic opposition between two "accents", derived from syllable count in Old Norse and determined partly phonologically, partly morphologically and partly lexically. However, the exact nature of this prosodic contrast is very different. In Norwegian and Swedish, the contrast is between two tonal accents, accent 1 and 2, which characterise a whole word with primary stress; in Danish, it is between the presence and the absence of the stød (a kind of laryngealisation), which characterises a syllable (though usually a syllable that bears at least secondary stress). Example: Danish løber "runner" [ˈløːpɐ] versus løber "runs" [ˈløːˀpɐ], Norwegian løper^{2} [lø̂ːpər] versus løper^{1} [lø̀ːpər], Swedish löpare^{2} [lø̂ːparɛ] versus löper^{1} [lø̀ːpɛr]. Note Danish landsmand [ˈlanˀsmanˀ] "compatriot" (one word, two støds) as opposed to Norwegian landsmann [lɑ̀nsmɑnː] and Swedish landsman [lɑ̀nsmɑnː] (one word, one accent).

Note: The pronunciation of the tone accents varies widely between Norwegian dialects; the IPA tone accent transcriptions above reflect South-East Norwegian pronunciation (found e.g. in Oslo). There is usually also high pitch in the last syllable, but it is not transcribed here, because it belongs to the prosody of the phrase rather than the word.

=== Vowels in inflections ===
Danish, Norwegian and Swedish in inflections (declension, conjugation) attach, albeit to a limited extent, endings. These endings are always unstressed and contain only short vowels. The use of vowels in these endings depends on the degree of reduction, which is highest in Danish. It allows only reduced <e> in endings, pronounced as [ə]. Bokmål most often has reduced <e> in endings, less often also <a>. Nynorsk uses <a> more often, other vowels less often. Swedish has the lowest reduction rate. It allows most vowels in endings, while the basic vowel in inflections is <a>.

Examples:

Grammar	Danish	Bokmål	Nynorsk	Swedish	Meaning
Nouns: singular and plural	gade – gader	gate – gater	gate – gater	gata – gator	street – streets
Nouns: singular and plural	dag – dage	dag – dager	dag – dagar	dag – dagar	day – days
Nouns: singular and plural	soldat – soldater	soldat – soldater	soldat – soldatar	soldat – soldater	soldier – soldiers
Nouns: singular and plural	hus – huse	hus – hus	hus – hus	hus – hus	house – houses
Nouns: definite plural form	dagene	dagene	dagane	dagarna	the days
Adjectives: definite form	store	store	store	stora (store)	the big
Adjectives: degrees of comparison	stærkere – stærkest	sterkere – sterkest	sterkare – sterkast	starkare – starkast	stronger – the strongest
Verbs: infinitive	kaste	kaste	kaste/kasta	kasta	to throw

=== Rendering of Graeco-Latin ae (αι) and oe (οι) ===
While Danish renders Graeco-Latin ae (αι) as æ (with some exceptions: Etiopien, Ægypten/Egypten), Norwegian and Swedish mostly use e. For example, Danish ækvivalent — Norwegian and Swedish ekvivalent (equivalent). In Norwegian, æ is kept before r: æra, kimære, sfære; Swedish has chimär, sfär but era. "Caesar" is spelled Cæsar in Danish and Norwegian; Swedish uses unligatured spelling Caesar, pronounced as if spelled *Cesar.

Graeco-Latin oe (οι) is rendered as ø in Danish and Norwegian, but as e in Swedish: Danish and Norwegian økologi — Swedish ekologi (ecology).

== Grammatical differences ==
=== Nominal morphology ===
==== Gender ====
Danish and Swedish have two grammatical genders – common (indefinite article en and definite article -en) and neuter (indefinite article et [Danish]/ett [Swedish] and definite article -et). In Norwegian, the system is generally the same, but some common words optionally use special feminine gender declension patterns, which have been preserved from Old Norse in Norwegian dialects and were re-introduced into the written language by the language reforms of the early 20th century. Hence, three genders are recognized – masculine (morphologically identical to Danish common, with indefinite article en and definite article -en), feminine (indefinite article ei and definite article -a) and neuter (morphologically identical to its Danish counterpart, with indefinite article et and definite article -et, pronounced /ə/). The likelihood of a feminine as opposed to common form being used depends on the particular word, as well as on style: common gender forms are often more formal or sometimes even bookish, while feminine forms tend to make a more colloquial and sometimes even rustic impression. Both variants are standard in Bokmål, whereas only the three-gender model is accepted in Nynorsk. Examples: Danish en mand – manden ("a man – the man"), en sol – solen ("a sun – the sun"), et hus – huset ("a house – the house") versus Norwegian en mann – mannen ("a man – the man"), ei sol – sola or en sol – solen ("a sun – the sun"), et hus – huset ("a house – the house").

The Norwegian feminine can also be expressed in the indefinite singular declension of the word liten, which has a special feminine form lita beside the neuter lite. Danish has only lille, which is the definite singular form in both languages.

==== Number ====
In Danish, the plural endings are -er, -e or zero-ending. The choice of ending is difficult to predict (although -er is especially common in polysyllables, loanwords and words ending in unstressed e; -e is most usual in monosyllables; and zero-ending is most usual in neuter monosyllables). In Norwegian, the plural suffix -e is used too, but the system is rather regularized, since it is only nouns ending with -er in uninflected form that get -e in indefinite plural form, and this is current for both masculine, feminine and neuter nouns; en skyskraper – skyskrapere "a skyscraper – skyscrapers"; en hamburger – hamburgere "a hamburger – hamburgers"; et monster – monstre "a monster – monsters"; et senter – sentre "a center – centers". The ending -er (-ar in Nynorsk) is dominant in masculine/feminine nouns and some neuters with several syllables, while zero-ending is prevalent in neuter gender monosyllables. Examples: Danish en appelsin – appelsiner, en hund – hunde, et hus – huse, et fald – fald, versus Norwegian en appelsin – appelsiner, en hund – hunder, et hus – hus, et fall – fall (singular and plural forms of "orange", "dog", "house" and "fall"). Swedish has five plural endings: -er, -or, -ar, -n and the zero ending (see the tables above and below).

In addition, the formation of the definite plural forms are somewhat different in the three languages. In Danish, plural forms in -er transform into definite plural -erne, while plurals in -e and zero-ending become -ene. Norwegian has generalized -ene (-ane in Nynorsk) for nearly all masculine and feminine words, and an -ene or -a for neuter words. A few masculine words also have an alternative ending -a, derived from -a(ne)/-æne in the spoken language (en feil – feila/feilene, "a mistake/error – the mistakes/errors"). Examples: Danish en sag – sager – sagerne, en dag – dage – dagene, et fald – fald – faldene, et ben – ben – benene versus Norwegian en sak – saker – sakene, en dag – dager – dagene, et fall – fall – fallene, et be(i)n – be(i)n – be(i)na/be(i)nene (singular, plural, and plural definite forms of "thing", "day", "fall" and "bone"/"leg"). Swedish adds -na to -er, -or, -ar; -a to -n; -en to zero ending.

Danish	Bokmål	Nynorsk	Swedish	Meaning
en gade – gaden gader – gaderne	en/ei gate – gaten/gata gater – gatene	ei gate – gata gater – gatene	en gata – gatan gator – gatorna	street
en dag – dagen dage – dagene	en dag – dagen dager – dagene	ein dag – dagen dagar – dagane	en dag – dagen dagar – dagarna	day
en sol – solen sole – solene	en/ei sol – solen/sola soler – solene	ei sol – sola soler – solene	en sol – solen solar – solarna	sun
en soldat – soldaten soldater – soldaterne	en soldat – soldaten soldater – soldatene	ein soldat – soldaten soldatar – soldatane	en soldat – soldaten soldater – soldaterna	soldier
en mus – musen mus – musene	en/ei mus – musen/musa mus – musene	ei mus – musa mus/myser – musene/mysene	en mus – musen möss – mössen	mouse
et hus – huset huse – husene	et hus – huset hus – husene/husa	eit hus – huset hus – husa	ett hus – huset hus – husen	house
et barn – barnet børn – børnene	et barn – barnet barn – barna/barnene	eit barn – barnet born/barn – borna/barna	ett barn – barnet barn – barnen	child
et æble – æblet æbler – æblerne	et eple – eplet epler – eplene/epla	eit eple – eplet eple – epla	ett äpple – äpplet äpplen – äpplena	apple

==== Definiteness ====
In the three languages, single nouns use a postpositive definite article. However, in Danish, when a noun is modified by an adjective, a prepositive definite article is used instead of the postpositive one. Norwegian and Swedish both add a prepositive article and keep the postpositive. Example: Danish hus – huset, et stort hus – det store hus versus Norwegian hus – huset, et stort hus – det store huset and Swedish hus – huset, ett stort hus — det stora huset (indefinite and definite forms of "a/the house" and "a/the big house"). In proper designations, Swedish only keeps the postpositive article, and Bokmål does not add it: Det Hvide Hus (Danish) – Det hvite hus (Norwegian Bokmål) – Det kvite huset (Norwegian Nynorsk) – Vita huset (Swedish) (the White House). The same difference applies when a demonstrative pronoun is used: Danish Jeg elsker den mand versus Norwegian Jeg elsker den mannen and Swedish Jag älskar den mannen (I love that man).

==== Adjectives ====
The declension of adjectives is basically the same in the three languages. Most of them form two forms in a single number: for the common gender (in Norwegian masculine and feminine) and for the neuter gender. In the plural, both genders have one form, which is at the same time a definite form, which is connected with nouns with a definite article.

In neuter forms, Swedish consistently appends the suffix -t (-tt) - except for the inflected adjectives of type bra (good). In Danish and even more often in Norwegian (especially Nynorsk) for some adjectives -t are not added:

svensk (Danish, Norwegian) - svenskt (Swedish) = Swedish

billigt (Danish, Swedish) - billig (Bokmål) - billeg (Nynorsk) = cheap

In Swedish, the spelling simplifies the group -dt (in neuter forms) to -tt: god / godt (Danish, Norwegian) - god / gott (Swedish) = good.

Definite and plural forms have the suffix -e in Danish and Norwegian, while -a in Swedish:

svenske søer (Danish) - svenske sjøer (Bokmål) - svenske sjøar (Nynorsk) - svenska sjöar (Swedish) = Swedish lakes

det gamle hus (Danish) - det gamle huset (nor.) - det gamla huset (Swedish) = (the) old house

In Swedish, definite forms of the original masculine gender with the ending -e are also possible in a singular number (only for male people): den gamle / gamla mannen = (the) old man.

==== Pronouns ====
- To denote second person plural, Danish uses I (oblique form jer, possessive pronoun jeres), while Norwegian uses dere (oblique dere, possessive deres). Swedish uses ni (oblique and possessive er); the variant I (oblique eder, possessive eder or eders) is obsolete.
- The 1st person plural possessive pronoun ("our") is vores (uninflected) in modern Danish, but vår (inflected: neuter vårt, plural våre [Norwegian] or våra [Swedish]) in Norwegian and Swedish. Example: Danish vores ven/hus/venner versus Norwegian vår venn/vårt hus/våre venner or, like in the spoken language, vennen vår/huset vårt/vennene våre ("our friend/house/friends"). In Danish, the original inflected variant vor (vort, vore) occurs only in more solemn or archaic style.
- The possessive pronouns always precede what they are modifying in Danish and Swedish; in Norwegian, they may also be placed after a definite noun or noun phrase. The choice of construction in Norwegian depends on the particular word and on style (the Danish-like construction is more formal or emphatic, the other one is more colloquial). Example: Danish min ven, min nye ven — Swedish min vän, min nya vän — Norwegian vennen min or min venn, den nye vennen min or min nye venn ("my friend", "my new friend"). Nynorsk does not allow the Danish construction, which in Bokmål was inherited from Danish.
- The reflexive possessive pronoun sin ("his/her/its own") can't refer to a plural subject in Danish, but it can do so in Norwegian and Swedish. Example: Danish Han vasker sine klæder like Norwegian Han vasker klærne sine and Swedish Han tvättar sina kläder ("He is washing his [own] clothes"); but Danish De vasker deres klæder versus Norwegian De vasker klærne sine and Swedish De tvättar sina kläder ("They are washing their [own] clothes").
- In Danish, the pronoun that expresses an unspecified, generalized person or group (corresponding to English "one", French "on" and German "man") is man in its main form, but its oblique form is en and its genitive form is ens. In Norwegian and Swedish, en can also be used as a main form. Example: Danish man kan ikke gøre det versus Norwegian man/en kan ikke gjøre det and Swedish man/en kan inte göra det ("one/people can't do that").
- In Danish and Swedish, the pronouns "such" and "so (=in this way)" are usually translated with sådan (slig [Danish]/slik [Swedish] is obsolete and solemn). In Norwegian, the most usual form is slik, but sådan is also correct (sånn can be somewhat colloquial).
- In Danish, Bokmål and Swedish, the pronouns han and hun (Danish and Bokmål)/hon (Swedish) refer to male and female people, but den and det are used for other common- and neuter-gender nouns. Nynorsk uses han for masculine nouns, ho for feminine nouns, det for neuter nouns.
- In Danish and Norwegian, the pronoun de (they) is pronounced [diː], but in Swedish its usual pronunciation is [dɔmː]; the same pronunciation is used for its oblique case dem, which in Danish and Norwegian is pronounced according to the spelling.

==== Numerals ====
There are significant differences between the numeral systems of Danish and Norwegian.

- In Danish, the number 7 is called syv. In Norwegian, it is called sju (although the 2005 language reform re-introduced syv as an alternative to sju).
- In Danish, 20 and 30 are called tyve and tredive. These forms (with tredive shortened to tredve) were replaced in Norwegian in 1951 by the native tjue /çʉːə/ and tretti. Like syv, which was replaced by sju at the same time, they still occur in Norwegian. The unofficial Riksmål standard retains the old forms.
- In Danish, the number 40 is called fyrre. In Norwegian, it is førti, although førr is permitted in riksmål.
- In Danish, the tens between 50 and 90 have different roots from the ones in most Germanic languages. Etymologically, like French numerals for 70, 80 and 90, they are based on a vigesimal system; in other words, the name of the number is based on how many times 20 it is. Thus, 60 is tres (short for tresindstyve, "3 times 20") and 50 is halvtreds (short for halvtredsindstyve, "2.5 times 20" or more literally "half-third times 20"). Similarly, 70 is halvfjerds, 80 is firs, and 90 is halvfems. In Norwegian, these numbers are constructed much like in English and German, as compound words of the respective unit and an old word for "ten": 50 = femti, 60 = seksti, 70 = sytti /søtːi/, 80 = åtti, 90 = nitti.
- In Danish, units are placed before tens (as in German and Early Modern English); in Norwegian, the reverse applies (as in Modern English), although the Danish order is also used by some speakers. Example: Danish enogtyve ("one-and-twenty") versus Norwegian tjueen ("twenty-one") or enogtyve.
- With regard to ordinal numbers, "second" has pretty much the same form in the two languages: anden (neuter andet, plural andre) in Danish and annen (neuter annet, plural andre) in Norwegian. However, Danish does not have a definite form but says den anden, whereas Norwegian uses den andre.

Swedish numerals are similar to Norwegian ones: sju (7), tjugo (20), trettio (30), fyrtio (40), femtio (50), sextio (60), sjuttio (70), åttio (80), nittio (90), tjugoen (21), andra (the second).

=== Verbal morphology ===
- Danish regular verbs can be divided in those that form their past tense and past participle with the suffixes -ede and -et /əð/, respectively, (e.g. "to throw", kaste – kastede – kastet) and those that form them with the suffixes -te and -t (e.g. "to read", læse – læste – læst). Although the group in -ede, -et is the largest one, the choice between these two conjugation patterns is mostly unpredictable. The corresponding Norwegian groups use -et, -et (kaste – kastet – kastet), and -te, -t (lese – leste – lest). However, unlike Danish, the choice of conjugation has come to be governed by a rule (with a few exceptions): verb stems containing a short vowel, followed by a long consonant or a consonant cluster (as in ramme), use -et, and verb stems containing a long vowel, followed by a short consonant (as in male), use -te (Danish ramme – ramte – ramt versus Norwegian ramme – rammet – rammet "to hit"; Danish male – malede – malet versus Norwegian male – malte – malt "to paint"). In addition, verb stems ending in a stressed vowel form a third group with no parallel in Danish, using the endings -dde, -dd ("to live [somewhere]" – bo – bodde – bodd). The corresponding Danish verbs nearly always use -ede, -et (bo – boede – boet). Swedish uses the endings -ade, -ad, -de, -d and -dde, -dd, where d or dd is replaced by t or tt in the neuter.

Bokmål has also introduced the optional use of the ending -a (taken from Norwegian dialects and used as the only allowed form in Nynorsk) instead of -et: thus, kaste – kasta – kasta, ramme – ramma – ramma, etc. The use of forms in -a is more common in speech than in writing. Nynorsk also allows infinitive ending in -a: kaste/kasta – kasta – kasta. Swedish also ends infinitives in -a.

- Some Danish irregular verbs have longer forms, ending in unstressed -de, -ge and -ve, which have been dropped in Norwegian. In many cases, the Danish verbs may also be pronounced in the contracted way. Examples: Danish lade – lod – ladet, sige – sagde – sagt, blive – blev – blevet versus Norwegian la – lot – latt, si – sa – sagt, bli – ble(i) – blitt ("let", "say", "become"). Other examples are tage – tog – taget versus ta – tok – tatt ("to take"), have – havde – haft versus ha – hadde – hatt ("to have"), etc.. The same reduction exists in some verbs in Swedish (e. g. bli – blev – bliven [besides the formal infinitive bliva]).
- The perfect forms in Danish may be formed either with the auxiliary verb have "to have" (as in English) or with være "to be". Some verbs always use være (ske "happen", holde op "stop"), while others can use both auxiliaries, but with slightly different meanings: han har rejst "he has travelled (spent some time travelling)" emphasizes the action itself, while han er rejst "he has left (so he isn't here now)" emphasizes the result of the action. In Norwegian and Swedish, ha "to have" may be – and increasingly is – used in all cases, and no specific verbs require være/vara: han er død (Danish) - han har dødd (Bokmål) - han har døydd / døytt (Nynorsk) - han har dött (Swedish) = he has died.
- Danish and Norwegian use the past participle in perfect tenses, but Swedish uses a different form, the supine. For weak verbs, it is identical to the neuter gender of the participle, but for strong verbs, the neuter of the participle ends in -et but the supine ends in -it.
- The past participle in Swedish is consistently inflected as an adjective. The participle of most verbs has three clearly distinguished forms (two in the singular for the common and neuter gender; one for both genders in the plural, which is also a definite form). The participle must agree with the noun in the gender and the number, whether placed before the noun or after another verb:

Biljetterna blev köpta och betalade. = Tickets have been bought and paid for.

In Danish and Bokmål, declension of participles is simplified. From most verbs, only a definite and indefinite form is formed, without distinction of gender. For strong verbs, some Danish verbs have preserved a form in a common gender with the ending -en (as in Swedish). If the participle comes after a verb, grammatical agreement does not apply in both languages:

Billeterne blev købt og betalt. (Danish) - Billettene ble kjøpt og betalt. (Bokmål) = Tickets have been bought and paid for.

In Nynorsk, as in Swedish, most participles are inflected, but some are indeclined (for example, the forms na -a: elska - see the table below). Grammatical agreement in the sentence is mandatory only for strong verbs, for weak verbs it is applied optionally and for some verbs it is not applied at all.

The present participles in all Scandinavian languages are indeclinable.

- S-forms of verbs, i. e. forms ending in -s (in Nynorsk -st), have three uses in all Scandinavian languages:
  - deponent verbs - verbs in passive form with active meaning;
  - reciprocal verbs - verbs expressing reciprocity;
  - passive voice, the so-called s-passive.

Deponent and reciprocal verbs are common to all languages. However, the use of s-forms is different. In Swedish, the passive voice is commonly expressed in this way (although the s-passive is more formal than the analytical passive). The suffix -s can be appended to any verb form (including supine) except for participles. In Danish and Norwegian, the s-passive is of limited use. In Danish and Bokmål, only the passive forms of the infinitive and the present tense are more commonly formed in this way. In Nynorsk, the ending -st can only be added to the infinitive that follows the modal verb, e.g.: Ingenting kunne gjørast. = There was nothing that could be done. Otherwise, the passive must be expressed analytically, or avoided altogether.

- Some examples of verbs in the three languages:

Love	Danish	Bokmål	Nynorsk	Swedish
infinitive	elske	elske	elske/elska	älska
present	elsker	elsker	elskar	älskar
past	elskede	elsket/elska	elska	älskade
perfect/pluperfect	har/havde elsket	har/hadde elsket/elska	har/hadde elska	har/hade älskat
past participle (passive)	elsket elskede	elsket/elska elskete/elskede/elska	elska	älskad älskat älskade
present participle	elskende	elskende	elskande	älskande
imperative	elsk	elsk	elsk	älska

Forget	Danish	Bokmål	Nynorsk	Swedish
infinitive	glemme	glemme/glømme	gløyme/gløyma	glömma
present	glemmer	glemmer/glømmer	gløymer	glömmer
past	glemte	glemte/glømte	gløymde	glömde
perfect/pluperfect	har/havde glemt	har/hadde glemt/glømt	har/hadde gløymt	har/hade glömt
past participle (passive)	glemt glemte	glemt/glømt glemte/glømte	gløymd/gløymt gløymt gløymde	glömd glömt glömda
present participle	glemmende	glemmende/glømmende	gløymande	glömmande
imperative	glem	glem/gløm	gløym	glöm

Live	Danish	Bokmål	Nynorsk	Swedish
infinitive	bo	bo	bu	bo
present	bor	bor	bur	bor
past	boede	bodde	budde	bodde
perfect/pluperfect	har/havde boet	har/hadde bodd	har/hadde budd/butt	har/hade bott
past participle (passive)	boet boete	bodd bodde	budd budd/butt budde	bodd bott bodda
present participle	boende	boende	buande	boende
imperative	bo	bo	bu	bo

Sing	Danish	Bokmål	Nynorsk	Swedish
infinitive	synge	synge	syngje/syngja	sjunga
present	synger	synger	syng	sjunger
past	sang	sang	song	sjöng
perfect/pluperfect	har/havde sunget	har/hadde sunget	har/hadde sunge/sungi	har/hade sjungit
past participle (passive)	sungen sunget sungne	sunget sungne	sungen sunge/sungi sungne	sjungen sjunget sjungna
present participle	syngende	syngende	syngande	sjungande
imperative	syng	syng	syng	sjung

=== Miscellaneous ===
Certain words present in all the three languages are used differently in each. This can result in identical sentences meaning different things in the three languages, or in constructions that make sense in one language becoming nonsensical in another one.

Examples include:

- må/kan – The word "må" usually means "must" in Norwegian, but can mean "may", "can", or "must" in Danish. Swedish uses kan for "can", måste for "must", and får or må for "may".
- der/som – Danish has both words for "which", although der is only used as the grammatical subject. In Norwegian, der is only used archaically or poetically. Swedish uses som, and vilken, vilket, vilka.
- nogle/nogen – in written Danish the counterparts of the English words "some" (in a plural sense) and "any" are spelled nogle and nogen, respectively – although in speech, nogle is pronounced just like nogen. In contrast, in Norwegian both are spelled identically, as noen (from Danish nogen). Swedish uses någon, några, en del, or somliga.
- kun/bare – in Danish, kun means roughly "only, solely" (referring to quantity or number) and bare "just, merely". Kun is used more often in Denmark, whereas bare is used more often in Norway. While there are rules in Danish that govern when to choose which word, in Norwegian bare may be – and usually is – used with both meanings. Swedish uses bara, endast or enkom.
- meget/mye – in Norwegian, the adverb meget (alternatively veldig etc.) modifies adjectives just like English "very", while mye is used like English "much, a lot". In Danish, meget is used in both cases. Swedish typically uses mycket or väldigt for "very", and mycket for "much".
- enda/ennå (ennu) – in Norwegian, ennå means "still, yet" in a temporal sense, but enda, which normally means "yet, nevertheless" among other things, is used in conjunction with comparative forms in expressions such as enda bedre, "better still". In Danish, endnu (the equivalent of ennå) is used in both cases. Swedish uses än, ännu for temporal "yet", "still" and "ändå" for contrastive and comparative meanings.
- The primary difference in preposition usage in the Danish and Norwegian languages is the use of i / på, (in English in / on). Although the two are generally used similarly in both languages, in certain cases the two languages choose a different preposition for the same construction. For example, "a quarter to five" would be kvart i fem in Danish, but kvart på fem in Norwegian. To express a period of time during which something has happened, Danish always uses i, but Norwegian uses i in affirmative and på in negative sentences: Danish jeg har (ikke) set ham i to år versus Norwegian jeg har sett ham i to år, jeg har ikke sett ham på to år ("I have [not] seen him for two years"). Swedish uses forms like kvart i fem, and ... sett honom i två års tid, but ... inte sett honom på två år.
- genitive constructions – unlike Danish, Norwegian very often uses the preposition til ("to") as a more informal alternative of genitive constructions: boka til Peter, or Peters bok versus Danish Peters bog. Norwegian also uses a construction with the reflexive pronoun, Peter sin bok, (Lit. Peter his book). This is in Norwegian bokmål called "garpegenitiv" and is (in bokmål) still considered substandard by some. Swedish is like Danish in this regard, except in some rural dialects.

== Vocabulary ==
=== Geographical names ===
==== Names of countries ====
Danish has adopted many German (particularly from Low German variants spoken by the Hanseatic League) words and grammatical structures, while Bokmål has rejected some of these imports. An example is the naming of countries; Danish and Swedish generally use the German names of countries, or at least the German ending.

These names were used in Norwegian as well, but have in modern times (during the second half of the 20th century) to a large extent been replaced by the Latin endings; this means that the usual ending is -a in Norwegian and -en or -et in Danish (the -en and -et endings are also the definite articles). In the case of Switzerland, which is known in written Danish and Swedish by its German name Schweiz, this is transliterated in Norwegian as Sveits.

As a result, Australien, Italien and Spanien are used in Danish and Swedish, but as Australia, Italia and Spania in Bokmål, although the earlier forms can be heard in speakers of more conservative forms (for instance Queen Sonja of Norway). Similarly, while Mongolia and Slovakia are now used in Norwegian, Mongoliet and Slovakiet/Slovakien are still used in Danish and Swedish.

In Danish, Latvia is referred to as Letland, similar to German Lettland (which is used in Swedish), whereas in Norwegian, it is referred to as Latvia (although Letland and Lettland were previously used), but Estonia and Lithuania are referred to in the three languages as Estland and Litauen, as in German.

Other differences include the use in Norwegian of the native names of countries. In Danish, Greece is referred to as Grækenland and in Swedish as Grekland, but in Norwegian, it is mostly referred to as Hellas (the Greek form of the name), even though the Danish-like Grekenland is sometimes used. Similarly, the name for Cyprus in Norwegian is the Greek-derived Kypros, rather than the Cypern (influenced by the German Zypern) used in Danish and Swedish.

Nevertheless, Norwegians usually use greker (noun) and gresk (adjective) for "Greek", not hellener (noun) and hellensk (adjective); the latter are used only when talking about Ancient Greece, in the sense of Hellenic, as in English and other languages.

In addition, Norwegian speakers, unlike Danish speakers, refer to the Netherlands as Nederland, as in Dutch, not as Holland, although Nederlandene is used in Danish in the same formal sense as "The Netherlands" would be in English. In Swedish, the form Nederländerna is used. Similarly the Dutch language is known as nederlandsk in Norway and nederländska in Sweden, but is most often called hollandsk in Denmark (the Norwegian dictionary Bokmålsordboka identify both Holland and hollandsk as previously commonly used in Norwegian).

By contrast, both Norwegian and Danish speakers refer to New Zealand by its English name (but Ny-Zealand is also used in Norwegian), whereas Swedish speakers call the country Nya Zeeland. However, "New Zealand" as an adjective is newzealandsk or nyzealandsk in Norwegian, whereas newzealandsk is encountered in Danish, In Danish, "New Zealander" is newzealænder while in Norwegian it can be translated as either newzealender or nyzealender.

English	Danish	Norwegian (Bokmål/Nynorsk)	Swedish
Albania	Albanien	Albania	Albanien
Algeria	Algeriet	Algerie	Algeriet
Armenia	Armenien	Armenia	Armenien
Australia	Australien	Australia	Australien
Austria	Østrig	Østerrike/Austerrike	Österrike
Belarus	Hviderusland (recently more commonly Belarus)	Belarus (Hviterussland/Kviterussland were official forms until 2022)	Vitryssland (recently more commonly Belarus)
Belgium	Belgien	Belgia	Belgien
Bosnia and Herzegovina	Bosnien-Hercegovina	Bosnia-Hercegovina	Bosnien och Hercegovina, Bosnien-Hercegovina, Bosnien
Brazil	Brasilien	Brasil	Brasilien
Bulgaria	Bulgarien	Bulgaria	Bulgarien
Cambodia	Cambodja	Kambodsja	Kambodja
Cameroon	Cameroun	Kamerun	Kamerun
Canada	Canada	Canada	Kanada
Cape Verde	Kap Verde	Kapp Verde	Kap Verde
Central African Republic	Den Centralafrikanske Republik	Den sentralafrikanske republikk	Centralafrikanska republiken
Chad	Tchad	Tsjad	Tchad
Comoros	Comorerne	Komorene	Komorerna
Congo, Republic of	Republikken Congo	Republikken Kongo	Kongo-Brazzaville, Republiken Kongo
Croatia	Kroatien	Kroatia	Kroatien
Cyprus	Cypern	Kypros	Cypern
Czech Republic, Czechia	Den Tjekkiske Republik, Tjekkiet	Den tsjekkiske republikk, Tsjekkia	Tjeckien
Democratic Republic of Congo	Den Demokratiske Republik Congo	Den demokratiske republikken Kongo	Kongo-Kinshasa, Demokratiska republiken Kongo
East Timor	Østtimor	Øst-Timor/Aust-Timor	Östtimor, Timor-Leste
Egypt	Egypten, Ægypten	Egypt	Egypten
Equatorial Guinea	Ækvatorialguinea	Ekvatorial-Guinea	Ekvatorialguinea
Ethiopia	Etiopien	Etiopia	Etiopien
France	Frankrig	Frankrike	Frankrike
Georgia	Georgien	Georgia	Georgien
Greece	Grækenland	Hellas	Grekland
India	Indien	India	Indien
Indonesia	Indonesien	Indonesia	Indonesien
Italy	Italien	Italia	Italien
Latvia	Letland	Latvia	Lettland
Libya	Libyen	Libya	Libyen
North Macedonia	Nordmakedonien	Nord-Makedonia	Nordmakedonien
Mauritania	Mauretanien	Mauritania	Mauretanien
Micronesia, Federated States of	Føderale statsforbund Mikronesien	Mikronesiaføderasjonen	Mikronesiens federerade stater, Mikronesiska federationen
Mongolia	Mongoliet	Mongolia	Mongoliet
Mozambique	Mozambique, Mocambique	Mosambik	Moçambique
North Korea	Nordkorea	Nord-Korea	Nordkorea
Philippines	Filippinerne	Filippinene	Filippinerna
Romania	Rumænien	Romania	Rumänien
Saudi Arabia	Saudi-Arabien	Saudi-Arabia	Saudiarabien
Serbia	Serbien	Serbia	Serbien
Slovakia	Slovakiet	Slovakia	Slovakien
Slovenia	Slovenien	Slovenia	Slovenien
Solomon Islands	Salomonøerne	Salomonøyene	Salomonöarna
South Africa	Sydafrika	Sør-Afrika	Sydafrika
South Korea	Sydkorea	Sør-Korea	Sydkorea
South Sudan	Sydsudan	Sør-Sudan	Sydsudan
Spain	Spanien	Spania	Spanien
Switzerland	Schweiz	Sveits	Schweiz
Syria	Syrien	Syria	Syrien
Tunisia	Tunisien	Tunisia	Tunisien
Turkey	Tyrkiet	Tyrkia	Turkiet
Ukraine	Ukraine	Ukraina	Ukraina
United Kingdom of Great Britain and Northern Ireland	Det Forenede Kongerige Storbritannien og Nordirland	Det forente kongerike Storbritannia og Nord-Irland/Det sameinte kongeriket Storbritannia og Nord-Irland	Storbritannien, Förenade konungariket Storbritannien och Nordirland, Förenade kungariket

==== Names of cities ====
There are also differences in the names of cities; each language choosing to use the more native name, or one borrowed from another language. For example:

- Helsinki in Norwegian, is referred to as Helsingfors, as in Swedish, whereas in Danish it is usually called Helsinki, as in Finnish.
- Brussels in Danish, is referred to as Bruxelles, as in French, or sometimes Bryssel as in Swedish, while in Norwegian it is known as Brussel, as in Dutch (but Bruxelles was permitted until 1961).
- Lisbon in Norwegian, however, is known as Lisboa, as in Portuguese, whereas in Danish and Swedish it is known as Lissabon, as in German. (However, Lissabon was previously used in Norwegian).
- Prague is known in Danish and Swedish as Prag, as in German, unlike Norwegian, in which the Czech name Praha is used.
- Bucharest likewise, is known in Danish and Swedish as Bukarest, but in Norwegian the Romanian name București is used.
- Belgrade is known in Danish and Norwegian under the Serbian name Beograd, but in Swedish the form Belgrad is used.
- Beijing likewise, is known in Danish and Norwegian in the pinyin spelling, but Swedish usually uses the form Peking.
- Moscow and Warsaw however, are known in all the three languages by their respective Russian and Polish names, Moskva and Warszawa.

=== Different words ===
Here are some examples of common words and expressions that are different in the three languages. Note that the Danish variant usually exists in Norwegian as an archaic or less frequent form (and/or vice versa).

English	Danish	Norwegian (Bokmål)	Swedish
afraid	bange, (arch., dial.:) ræd	redd, but also bange (archaic, mostly used in standard expressions like "bange anelser")	rädd, skrämd
afterwards	bagefter, derefter	etterpå, efterpå (conservative), deretter/derefter	efteråt, därefter
angry	vred	sint, vred (literary)	arg, ilsk, ilsken, vred, förbannad
autumn	efterår, (poet.:) høst	høst, etterår/efterår (archaic)	höst
be correct, hold true	passe, stemme	stemme	stämma
black	sort	svart, sort	svart
boy	dreng, (colloquial:) gut	gutt, dreng (archaic or used in a more narrow sense)	pojke, dräng (archaic or used in a more narrow sense)
breakfast	morgenmad	frokost	frukost, morgonmål (dated)
breathe	ånde	puste, ånde	andas
cinema	biograf, kino (old-fashioned)	kino, biograf (older cinemas)	bio, biograf
cold	kold	kald, kold	kall, kylig
comb (verb)	rede	gre(ie), kjemme	kamma
decade	årti, tiår, dekade	tiår, årti, dekade	årtionde
difficult	svær, vanskelig	vanskelig	svår, vansklig, besvärlig
dinner	middag, aftensmad	middag	middag, supé (late dinner), kvällsmål (dated)
easy	nem, let	lett, enkel	lätt, enkel, simpel
evening	aften, (poet.:) kvæld	kveld, aften	kväll, afton
fact	kendsgerning, faktum	faktum, kjennsgjerning	faktum
fast, quick(ly)	hurtig, rask	fort (adv), rask (adj), hurtig	snabb (adj), snabbt (adv), fort (adv)
floor (storey)	etage, sal	etasje	våning, etage (rare)
forward	frem(over)	frem(over), fram(over)	framåt
frog	frø	frosk	groda
fun	sjov	moro, gøy	skoj, rolig, kul, lustig, komisk, festlig
future	fremtid	fremtid, framtid	framtid
girl	pige	jente, pike	flicka, tjej, jänta, piga (archaic or used in a more narrow sense)
good	god(t)	bra, god(t)	bra, god
healthy	rask, sund, frisk	frisk, sunn	frisk, sund
hesitate	tøve, nøle	nøle	tveka
hydrogen	brint, hydrogen	hydrogen, vannstoff (archaic)	väte
isn't it?/didn't he? etc.	... , ikke/vel? ikke sandt?, ikke også?	... , ikke sant?	..., eller hur?, inte sant?
jealous	jaloux, skinsyg, misundelig	sjalu, misunnelig	avundsjuk, svartsjuk, missunnsam
last year	sidste år, i fjor	i fjor	förra året, i fjol
like (vb. enjoy)	kunne lide	like	tycka om, gilla, uppskatta
lunch	frokost	lunsj (alt. lønsj or lunch), formiddagsmat	lunch, frukost (dated), middag (dated)
maybe	måske, muligvis, kanske (old-fashioned)	kanskje, muligvis, måskje (archaic)	kanske, möjligtvis, möjligen
moustache	overskæg	bart, overskjegg	mustasch
oxygen	ilt, oxygen	oksygen, surstoff	syre, oxygen (only in chemistry)
potato	kartoffel	potet, kartoffel (outdated)	potatis
rubbish (nonsense)	sludder, vrøvl, vås, nonsens	sludder, vrøvl, nonsens, tull, tøys, vås	strunt, trams, nonsens, sladder
satisfied/pleased	tilfreds, fornøjet	fornøyd, tilfreds	nöjd, tillfreds
sheep	får	sau, smale (archaic/dialectal), får (archaic/dialectal, used in expressions/ fixed phrases)	får, lamm
short (person)	lille, lav	kort, lav	kort, kortväxt, liten
sometimes	somme tider, iblandt, (colloquial:) nogle gange, af og til, indimellem,	iblant, av og til, innimellom	ibland, av och till, då och då, emellanåt
spring(time)	forår, (poet.:) vår	vår, forår (archaic)	vår
still (yet)	stadigvæk, fremdeles (archaic), fortsat	fremdeles, fortsatt	fortfarande, ännu
team	hold	lag	lag, team
there, thither (about direction)	derhen	der hen, derhen (riksmål), dit, dithen	dit, ditåt
toad	tudse	padde	padda
ugly	grim, (ethically:) styg	stygg, grim	ful, otäck
usual	sædvanlig, vanlig (archaic)	vanlig, sedvanlig	vanlig, sedvanlig
worm (earthworm)	orm	[meite]makk, [mete]mark, orm (Ambiguous, could mean both worm and snake, cf. wyrm.)	mask
wrong	forkert, gal(t)	gal(t), feil	fel, galet

=== False friends ===
While most words have the same meaning, there are also a number of false friends. These are often cognates that have diverged in meaning.

Word	Danish meaning	Norwegian meaning	Swedish meaning	Notes
bedrift	achievement	company	achievement	
bolle	bun / sexual intercourse	bun / bowl / (sexual intercourse, in some areas)	bun (bulle)	
by	city, town	city, town	hamlet, village	
flink	nice	skilled, clever	nimble, deft	
företag	project, business venture (foretagende)	project, company (foretak)	company	Danish/Norwegian: selskab / selskap
grine	laugh	cry	to weep (grina) (colloquial)	cognates with English "grin"
kneppe	to fuck	to button, unbutton	to button	
kuk	mess, problem	penis (vulgar)	penis (vulgar)	cognates with English "cock"
pule	to have sexual intercourse	to have sexual intercourse	to push into a bag (pula)	
rar	kind, nice	strange, weird	kind	
rask	healthy, fast	fast / litter, garbage	fast	
rolig	calm	calm	fun, funny	
svær	difficult / obese	large	difficult (svår)	

The vulgar nature of some of these differences forms the basis of a number of television sketches by Norwegian comedians.

== See also ==
- Norwegian language conflict
- Dano-Norwegian
- Icelandic
