= Retskrivningsordbogen =

Danish spelling dictionary

Retskrivningsordbogen (lit. The Orthographical Dictionary) is a Danish spelling dictionary published by the Danish Language Council to establish the official spelling of the Danish language. It is sometimes abbreviated unofficially to RO.

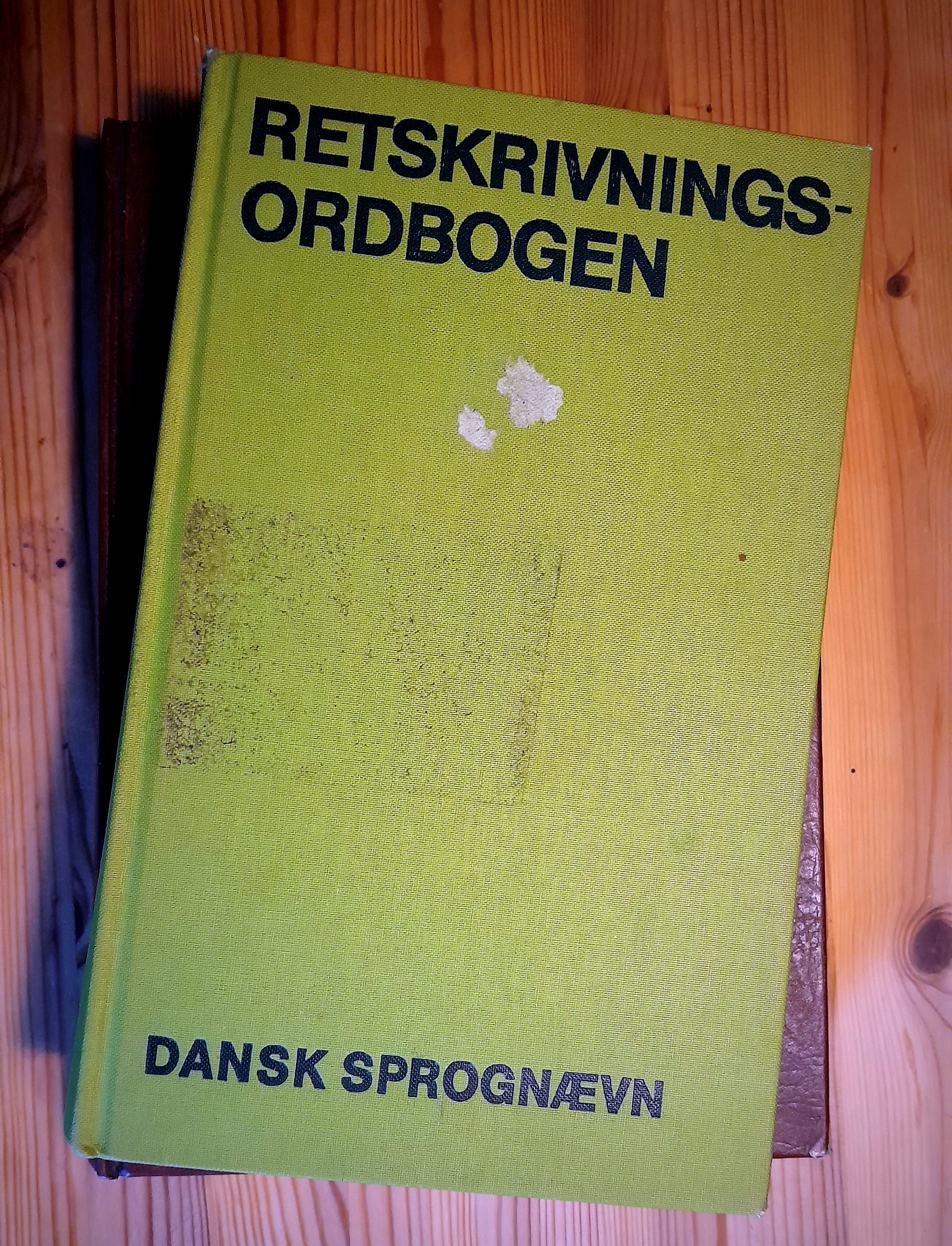
Retskrivningsordbogen

In accordance with the Danish Retskrivningslov (Orthography Law) the rules laid down in Retskrivningsordbogen must be followed by all areas of public administration, the parliament and authorities related to the parliament as well as the courts, although the minister of education may lay down detailed rules for exceptions. In practice, it is also followed by most other Danish-speaking organizations. The dictionary has around 64,000 words and contains a detailed guide to Danish orthography.

== History ==
The first official Danish spelling dictionary was Svend Grundtvig's Dansk Haandordbog, published in 1872. The second edition was published in 1880. Then came Dansk Retskrivningsordbog (Danish Spelling Dictionary) by Viggo Saaby with the first edition in 1891, the second edition in 1892 and the third edition in 1896. The dictionary was continued by P. K. Thorsen under the name Saabys Retskrivningsordbog (Saaby's Spelling Dictionary). With that title, the fourth edition was published in 1904, the fifth edition in 1909, the sixth edition in 1913, the seventh edition in 1918, and the eighth edition in 1918. The editions complied with the Ministry of Education's communications on spelling from 1889, 1892, 1900 and 1902. The seventh and eighth editions were expressly authorized by the Ministry of Education and contained one of the ministry's approved spelling guidelines prepared by Henrik Bertelsen.

Then came a new Dansk Retskrivningsordbog (Danish Spelling Dictionary) published by Undervisningsministeriets Retskrivningudvalg (the Ministry of Education's Spelling Committee) under the leadership of Jørgen Glahder. Three editions were published in 1923, 1925 and 1929. The third edition was last published in 1946.

The Spelling Committee was dissolved in 1948. From 1953 to 1955, a new committee prepared the first spelling dictionary after the spelling reform of 1948. This dictionary was published by the then newly established Danish Language Council in 1955 and was titled Retskrivningsordbog (Spelling Dictionary). It was published only as a first version and remained in use until 1986 although it was reprinted many times during its life of 31 years.

In 1986 came the first version of Retskrivningsordbogen, the first dictionary that was both prepared and published by the Danish Language Council. The second edition appeared in 1996, the third edition in 2001, the fourth edition in 2012, and the current fifth edition in 2024. The new comma rules from 2003 are included in the fourth reprint of the third edition Retskrivningsordbogen in 2005.

== Comma rules ==
All official spelling guidelines up to and including the first version of Retskrivningsordbogen contained rules for the two comma systems that can be freely chosen: the grammatical comma and the pause comma.

In the second version of Retskrivningsordbogen in 1996 there were therefore a few basic changes: the pause comma was removed as an official Danish comma system. The previous grammatical comma was renamed the traditional comma and a new grammatical comma system called the new comma was introduced. These two grammatical comma systems were very similar. The only difference between them was that in the new comma, a comma should not be used at the beginning of non-parenthetical subordinate clauses, as required by the traditional comma system. The Language Council recommended that the new comma system be brought into official use. There were no fundamental changes regarding commas in the third edition which appeared in 2001.

Despite persistent attempts by the Language Council to promote it, the new comma was not widely used and it was often criticized in the public debate. In 2003, the Language Council suddenly changed the comma rules with support from the ministers of culture and of education. The two rather similar grammatical comma systems were merged into a single system under which one is free to choose one or other approach to the single issue on which they differed. The 2003 changes are therefore more a matter of naming than of actual content. One of the few real changes is that it is no longer mandatory to put a comma (or other punctuation mark) in front of the word men (which means but).

The new rules were published in 2004 in a booklet titled Kommaregler (Comma Rules). The text also forms part of the fourth reprint of the third edition (2005).

== Online access ==
Retskrivningsordbogen is also accessible online.
