= Nils Vogt (journalist) =

Norwegian journalist and newspaper editor (1859–1927)

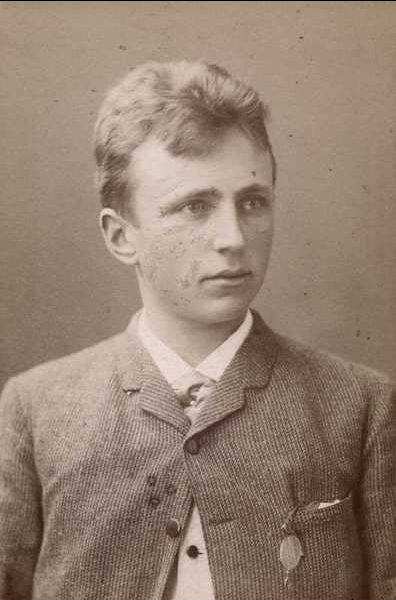
Nils Vogt in the 1880s

Nils Vogt (27 October 1859 – 27 June 1927) was a Norwegian journalist and newspaper editor. Born into a family of politicians and civil servants, he became the first chairman of the Norwegian Press Association and the Conservative Press Association. Vogt worked at the conservative newspaper Morgenbladet for 45 years, acting as editor-in-chief from 1894 to 1913. He wrote numerous articles during his lifetime, advocating independence from Sweden and the Riksmål standard of written Norwegian.

== Early life and education ==
Nils Vogt was born in Bergen as the son of politician Niels Petersen Vogt (1817–94) and his wife Karen Magdalena ("Kaja") Ancher Arntzen (1819–70). Amongst Nils Vogt's forebears were many politicians and government officials. His brother was Paul Benjamin Vogt (1863–1947) and his second cousins were Johan Vogt (1858–1932), Nils Collett Vogt (1864–1937) and Ragnar Vogt (1870–1943). Growing up in Kristiansand and Christiania (today Oslo), he finished his secondary education in 1876. He graduated with a cand.jur. degree in 1881 after having studied law at the Royal Frederick University in Christiania.

== Journalistic and political career ==
After a brief stint in Statistics Norway, Vogt began devoting his life to journalism, picking up a job for the newspaper Morgenbladet. His decision to make a career within journalism was met with disdain among his peers and family. He worked in the beginning as sub-editor for the editor-in-chief Christian Friele, whom he succeeded in 1894. The press historian Rune Ottosen writes in Vogt's entry for Norsk biografisk leksikon that he "unfolded his wide journalistic commitment for politics" in the newspaper. Having a profound interest in the plays of Henrik Ibsen, Vogt also wrote theatre reviews for the newspaper. From 1905 to 1915, Vogt was a correspondent to The Times. He subsequently was correspondent to Stockholms Dagblad and other newspapers in Northern Europe.

"I have frequented Swedish political environments quite a bit, and have felt the pitying condescension when the big brother pats his little brother on the shoulder when he is a good boy and does what big brother wants him to do. This pat still burns me in the skin, and I wish to no more make myself deserve it."

— Vogt in an article directed at Francis Hagerup. (Note: Norwegian: Jeg har vanket nokså meget i svenske politiske kretser og følt den medlidende nedladenhet hvormed Storebror klapper Lillegutt på skulderen, når han er snild gutt og gjør det Storebror vil. Det klapp brenner mig ennu i huden, jeg ønsker aldri mer å gjøre mig fortjent dertil.)

When it came to politics, Vogt was a conservative with many liberal opinions. He disagreed with Francis Hagerup, who supported the Union between Sweden and Norway. In his political articles, he championed the Riksmål written standard and the policies of Michelsen's Cabinet.

Having founded the Conservative Press Association in 1892, Vogt was its first chairman, serving from 1892 to 1898 and from 1906 to 1909. He was also elected the first chairman of the Norwegian Press Association (NP), notwithstanding his controversial position in the press of Kristiania. In 1910, he penned an article for the periodical Samtiden entitled "Pressen og kapitalen" ("The Press and The Capital"), in which he made the distinction between newspaper editors who were solely motivated by profit and those who regarded the job as an ideal life mission. The article was reprinted in his 1913 book Under Frieles haand og paa egen.

In 1910, controversy arose in the NP when lawyer Olaf Madsen – who had cooperated with Ola Thommessen for more than 20 years at the newspaper Verdens Gang and was responsible for its economic decisions – wanted to have more dividend for his investments in the newspaper. Editor Ola Thommessen considered this to be an inappropriate intervention in the editorial part of the newspaper, and took his staff with him and started a new newspaper named Tidens Tegn. Vogt supported Thommessen in his decision, and came at odds with the chairman of Morgenbladet's board, lawyer and politician Edmund Harbitz. Both left Morgenbladet in the summer of 1913 as a result of the disaccord, although Vogt continued as theatre and literature critic in the paper until his 1927 death. As editor, Vogt was succeeded by C. J. Hambro.

== Marriage, honours and death ==
On 6 November 1884, Vogt married Helena Andrea Ottesen (1861–1906). Acting as Norwegian president in the Nordic press partnership, he attended the press meetings in Kristiania in 1899 and in Copenhagen in 1902. He was also delegated to the international press congresses in Stockholm (1897), Rome (1899) and Berlin (1909). He was decorated as a Knight, First Class of the Royal Norwegian Order of St. Olav in 1907. He was also a knight of the Danish Order of the Dannebrog and the French Legion of Honour. Vogt died in Aker (now Oslo) on 27 June 1927.

== Notes and references ==
Endnotes

Notes

Bibliography

- Bratberg, Terje (2005). "Nils Vogt – 1". In Helle, Knut (ed.). Norsk biografisk leksikon (in Norwegian). Vol. 9 (2nd ed.). Oslo: Kunnskapsforlaget.
- Godal, Anne Marit, ed. (2009). "Vogt". Store norske leksikon (in Norwegian). Oslo: Kunnskapsforlaget.
- Gylseth, Christopher Hals (2005). "Ola Thommessen". In Helle, Knut (ed.). Norsk biografisk leksikon (in Norwegian). Vol. 9 (2nd ed.). Oslo: Kunnskapsforlaget.
- Holand, Johan E. (1992). "Den Konservative Presses Forening gjennom 100 år". In Holand, Johan E.; Larssen, Svein Døvle; Julsrud, Ottar (eds.). Presse med mening: Den Konservative Presses Forening 1892–1992 (in Norwegian). Oslo: Conservative Press Association. pp. 55–111. ISBN 82-992630-1-8.
- Ottosen, Rune (1996). Fra fjærpenn til Internett: Journalister i organisasjon og samfunn (in Norwegian). Oslo: Aschehoug. ISBN 82-03-26128-0.
- Helle, Knut, ed. (2005). "Nils Vogt – 2". Norsk biografisk leksikon (in Norwegian). Vol. 9 (2nd ed.). Oslo: Kunnskapsforlaget.
- Överland, O. A. (1921). "Nils V.". In Westrin, Th. (ed.). Nordisk familjebok (in Swedish). Vol. 32 (revised and illustrated ed.). Stockholm: Nordisk familjeboks förlag. Col. 959.
- Thyness, Paul (2001). "C J Hambro". In Helle, Knut (ed.). Norsk biografisk leksikon (in Norwegian). Vol. 4 (2nd ed.). Oslo: Kunnskapsforlaget.
- With, Nanna, ed. (1920). "Vogt Nils". Illustrert biografisk leksikon (in Norwegian) (Folkeutgave ed.). Oslo: With & CO.s Forlag.

Media offices
| Preceded by Christian Friele | Chief editor of Morgenbladet; 1894–1913 | Succeeded by C. J. Hambro |
| Preceded by position created | Chairman of the Norwegian Press Association; 1910–1912 | Succeeded by Hans Volckmar |
