= Conservative Press Association =

Norwegian media institution

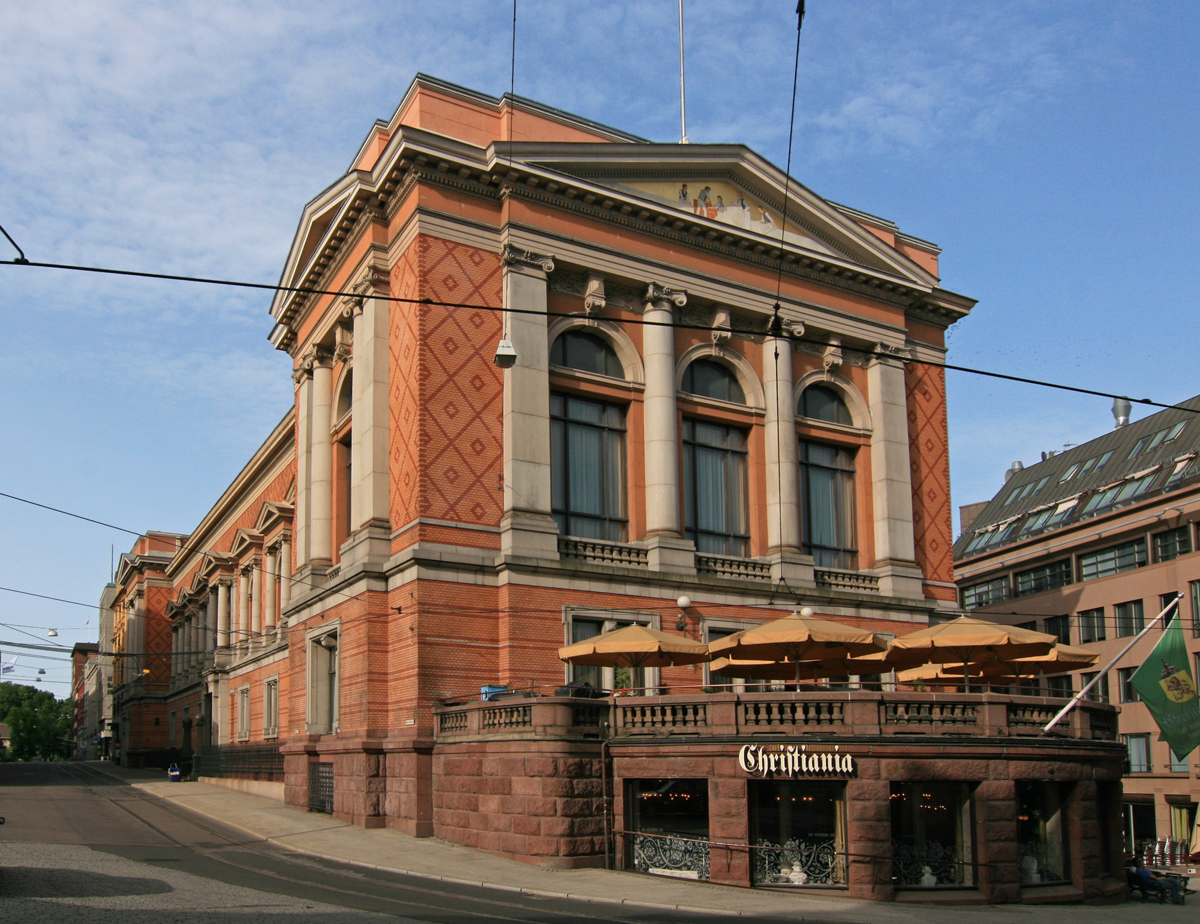
The Conservative Press Association was established in the headquarters of the Norwegian Order of Freemasons in 1892

The Conservative Press Association (Norwegian: Den Konservative Presses Forening; shortened DKPF) was a Norwegian media institution whose stated objective was the furtherance of conservative daily newspapers. Amongst its members were editors, journalists, publishers and businesspeople who were involved in declared conservative newspapers. The activity in the association faded out concurrently with the discontinuance of party newspapers in Norway.

== History ==
=== Founding and heyday ===
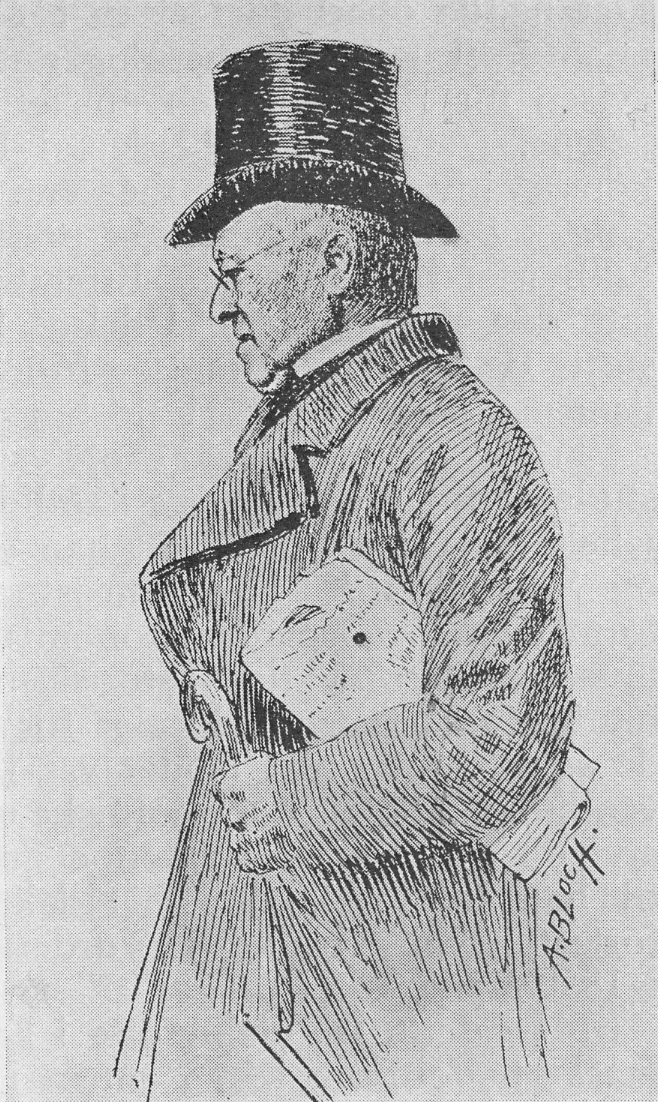
Christian Friele was honorary member of the association, despite not attending any of its meetings.

The Conservative Press Association was established on 29 August 1892 in the headquarters of the Norwegian Order of Freemasons, with Nils Vogt and Amandus Schibsted as initiators. It was not the first press association in Norway; the Norwegian Journalist Association had erstwhile been established on 24 January 1883. Vogt was elected the first chairman, and served in this position until 1906, apart from an interruption from 1898 to 1906. The editor of Morgenbladet, Christian Friele, was an honorary member of the association, despite not attending any of its meetings. In 1894, the Liberal Press Association (Norwegian: Venstres Presseforening) was established. Despite their irreconcilable political positions, the two press associations cooperated extensively; in 1899 they issued a leaflet on Norway's political position in the dissolution of the personal union with Sweden in 1905.

The association championed the Riksmål standard of written Norwegian and opposed the Samnorsk line. The chairman Thorstein Diesen was, however, ambivalent towards this approach; he maintained that the endeavour for the Riksmål standard ought not to become a conservative cause.

At the Conservative Party's national convention in 1893, it was decided that the press association could send its own delegation to future national conventions. At the 1908 convention, Amandus Schibsted suggested to the central board of the party that it grant all chief editors of the press association access to the party's national conventions. This suggestion was adopted; the editors could thereupon access the national conventions on the same conditions as members of parliament.

In the 1930s, it was called for a unification of the conservative newspapers in the country. Rolv Werner Erichsen, an ardent conservative, established an office for the administration of the Conservative Party's newspapers in 1935. It was located in the editorial office of the Morgenbladet newspaper and distributed news material to newspapers that subscribed to the office's deliveries. In the late 1930s, the association remained sceptical towards fascism and nazism, and argued against creating affinities between the conservative newspapers, Nasjonal Samling and the Fatherland League. It also opposed proposals to encroach free speech.

=== Post-war years and decline ===
The editor Johs. Nesse of Aftenposten summoned the first meeting in the association after the war, on 19 October 1945. Chief editor Harald Torp was elected chairman, despite not attending the meeting. The association experienced increasing number of members after the war; in 1945 it had 55, whilst it in the following year had 65 members. The efforts to unite the conservative press were resumed after the war; in 1945 the joint body Norsk Høyrepresse ("Norwegian Conservative Press") was established, comprising DKPF and Høyres Bladeierforening ("The Conservative Party's Newspaper Owner Association"). The joint body organised the merger of Høirepressens Propaganda- og Organisasjonskontor and Høirepressens Oslokontor; together they formed Høires Pressekontor, which eventually was renamed Høyres Pressebyrå.

DKPF lost political influence in the 1960s and beyond, despite its heavy representation in the organs of the Conservative Party. In the early 1970s, the conservative newspapers in the country became subject of criticism, and their representation in the organs of the party was called into question. Towards the end of the 1980s, the chairman Fredrik Th. Bolin urged the conservative newspapers in the country to cease using the description "right-wing press", as the newspapers were neither owned, edited nor organised by the Conservative Party. In 2002, the remaining activity in the association vanished.

== Bibliography ==
- Holand, Johan E. (1992). "Den Konservative Presses Forening gjennom 100 år". In Holand, Johan E.; Larssen, Svein Døvle; Julsrud, Ottar (eds.). Presse med mening: Den Konservative Presses Forening 1892–1992 (in Norwegian). Oslo: Conservative Press Association. pp. 55–111. ISBN 82-992630-1-8.
