= Fredrik Th. Bolin =

Norwegian newspaper editor (1931–2005)

Fredrik Thorstein Bolin
- Born: 8 May 1931
- Died: 13 October 2005 (aged 74)
- Employers: Moss Avis; Mannskapsavisa; Aftenposten
- Organisations: Conservative Press Association; Round Table
- Awards: Paul Harris Medal; Antarctica Service Medal; Médaille de courage et de dévouement

Fredrik Thorstein Bolin (8 May 1931 – 13 October 2005) was a Norwegian newspaper editor.

He was born in Moss, and finished his secondary education in 1949. He was a journalist in Moss Avis from 1949 to 1950 and Mannskapsavisa from 1950 to 1951. After a period as a science student, he worked in Moss Avis again from 1955 to 1960. He was also a member of Moss city council from 1955 to 1959. He had a break in 1957, when he was a freelance journalist in South America. He was hired in Aftenposten in 1965, and was the newspaper's correspondent in Brussels from 1970 to 1976 and subeditor from 1976 to 1977. From 1977 to 1992 he was the editor-in-chief of Moss Avis, and from 1986 to 1994 he chaired the Conservative Press Association. He became an honorary member of the latter organization together with Johan E. Holand in 1994.

He was a board member of the Norwegian UNESCO commission from 1983 to 1987, chaired Round Table in Norway from 1970 to 1971, and was also active in the Norwegian Red Cross and Norsk Polarklubb and received the Paul Harris Medal from Rotary. He also received the Antarctica Service Medal and the Médaille de courage et de dévouement. He died in 2005.
