= Norwegian language conflict =

Controversy between varieties of the Norwegian language

Map of the official language forms of Norwegian municipalities as of 2024: Bokmål Nynorsk Neutral

The Norwegian language conflict (Norwegian: språkstriden, Danish: sprogstriden) is an ongoing controversy in Norwegian culture and politics about the different varieties of written Norwegian. From 1536/1537 until 1814, Danish was the standard written language of Norway due to the union of crowns with Denmark. As a result, the proximity of modern written Norwegian to Danish underpins controversies in nationalism, rural versus urban cultures, literary history, diglossia (colloquial and formal dialects, standard language), spelling reform, and orthography.

In the United Kingdoms of Denmark and Norway, the official languages were Danish and German. The urban Norwegian upper class spoke Dano-Norwegian (dansk-norsk) (Danish, with Norwegian pronunciation and other minor local differences), while most people spoke their local and regional dialect. After the Treaty of Kiel transferred Norway from Denmark–Norway to Sweden–Norway in 1814, Dano-Norwegian (or "det almidelige bogmaal") was the sole official language until 1885 when Ivar Aasen's Landsmaal gained recognition.

In the early 1840s, young linguist Ivar Aasen traveled the countryside gathering up the words and grammar used there. He assembled a Norwegian language based on dialects little affected by Danish and published his first grammar and dictionary of the Norwegian people's language (Folkemål), in 1848 and 1850 respectively. He and many other authors wrote texts in their own dialects from around this time.

Norwegian is a North Germanic language. Dano-Norwegian, which began as a tongue readily accessible to (and essentially written as) Danish, took in increasing amounts of Norwegian. Meanwhile, Aasen's "people's language" became established. Parliament decided in 1885 that the two forms of written Norwegian were to be equally official. Both went through some name changes until 1929, when parliament decided that the one originally based on Danish should be called Bokmål (literally "book language") and the one based on Norwegian dialects should be called Nynorsk ("new Norwegian").

In the early 20th century, a more activist approach to written Norwegian was adopted. The government attempted over several decades to bring the two language forms closer to each other with the goal of merging them but failed due to widespread resistance from both sides. The now-abandoned official policy to merge Bokmål and Nynorsk into one written standard called Samnorsk through a series of reforms has created a wide spectrum of varieties of the two. An unofficial form called Riksmål is considered more conservative than Bokmål. Similarly, the unofficial Høgnorsk is much closer to Aasen's mid-1800s language than to today's Nynorsk. Norwegians are educated in whichever form is more widespread where they live (hovedmål/hovudmål) and the resultant secondary language form (sidemål, "side language").

There is no officially sanctioned spoken standard of Norwegian, but according to some linguists, like Kjell Venås, one de facto spoken standard is akin to Bokmål, Urban East Norwegian (Standard øst-/austnorsk).

== Sample ==
Danish text
I 1877 forlod Brandes København og bosatte sig i Berlin. Hans politiske synspunkter gjorde dog, at Preussen blev ubehagelig for ham at opholde sig i, og han vendte i 1883 tilbage til København, hvor han blev mødt af en helt ny gruppe af forfattere og tænkere, der var ivrige efter at modtage ham som deres leder. Det vigtigste af hans senere arbejder har været hans værk om William Shakespeare, der blev oversat til engelsk af William Archer og med det samme blev anerkendt.
Norwegian (Bokmål)
I 1877 forlot Brandes København og bosatte seg i Berlin. Hans politiske synspunkter gjorde imidlertid at det ble ubehagelig for ham å oppholde seg i Preussen, og i 1883 vendte han tilbake til København, der han ble møtt av en helt ny gruppe forfattere og tenkere, som var ivrige etter å motta ham som sin leder. Det viktigste av hans senere arbeider er hans verk om William Shakespeare, som ble oversatt til engelsk av William Archer, og som straks ble anerkjent.
Norwegian (Nynorsk)
I 1877 forlét Brandes København og busette seg i Berlin. Då dei politiske synspunkta hans gjorde det utriveleg for han å opphalda seg i Preussen, vende han attende til København i 1883. Der vart han møtt av ei heilt ny gruppe forfattarar og tenkjarar som var ivrige etter å ha han som leiar. Det viktigaste av dei seinare arbeida hans er verket om William Shakespeare, som vart omsett til engelsk av William Archer og som straks vart anerkjend.
English translation
In 1877 Brandes left Copenhagen and took up residence in Berlin. However, his political views made Prussia an uncomfortable place in which to live and in 1883 he returned to Copenhagen. There he was met by a completely new group of writers and thinkers who were eager to accept him as their leader. The most important of Brandes' later works is his writing on Shakespeare which, translated to English by William Archer, received recognition immediately.

1. Excerpts from the articles about Danish critic Georg Brandes from the Danish Wikipedia, version from 19 May 2006, 09:36 and Norwegian (bokmål) Wikipedia, version from 4 April 2006, 01:38.

== History ==
=== Background ===
The earliest examples of non-Danish Norwegian writing are from the 12th century, with Konungs skuggsjá being the prime example. The language in use at this time is known as Old Norse, and was widely used in writing in Norway and Iceland. The languages of Sweden and Denmark at this time were not very different from that of Norway, and are often also called Old Norse. Although some regional variations are apparent in written documents from this time, it is hard to know precisely the divisions between spoken dialects. This interim Norwegian is known as middle Norwegian (mellomnorsk).

With the Black Death in 1349, Norway's economy and political independence collapsed, and the country came under Danish rule. The Norwegian language also underwent rather significant changes, shedding complex grammatical forms and adopting a new vocabulary.

The Norwegian written language at this time gradually fell into disuse and was eventually abandoned altogether in favor of written Danish, the culminating event being the translation in 1604 of Magnus the Lawmender's code into Danish. The last example found of an original Middle Norwegian document is from 1583.

Norwegian dialects, however, lived on and evolved within the general population as vernacular speech, even as the educated classes gradually adopted a Dano-Norwegian koiné in speech. The Norwegian-born writer Ludvig Holberg became one of the leading exponents of standard written Danish, even as he retained a few distinctly Norwegian forms in his own writing.

In fact, Norwegian writers—even those who were purists of the Danish language—never fully relinquished their native vocabulary and usage in their writing. Examples include Petter Dass, Johan Nordahl Brun, Jens Zetlitz, and Christian Braunmann Tullin. Although Danish was the official language of the realm, Norwegian writers experienced a disparity between the languages they spoke and wrote.

In the late 18th century, educator Christian Kølle's writings—such as Ær dæt Fårnuftigt at have Religion? åk Vilken av så mange ær dæn Fårnuftigste?—utilized many of his at-the-time controversial linguistic ideas, which included phonemic orthography, using the feminine grammatical gender in writing, and the letter ⱥ (a with a slash through it, based on ø) to replace aa.

In 1814, Norway separated from Denmark as the Kingdom of Norway and adopted its own constitution. It was forced into a new, but weaker, union with Sweden, and the situation evolved into what follows:

- The written language was Danish, although the ruling class regarded it as Norwegian, which was important in order to mark Norway's independence from Sweden.
- The ruling class spoke Dano-Norwegian. They regarded it as the cultivated Norwegian language, as opposed to the common language of workers, craftspeople, and farmers.
- The rest of the population spoke Norwegian dialects. These were generally considered vulgar speech, or perhaps a weak attempt at speaking "standard" Norwegian, by the upper class who ignored or did not recognise the fact that the dialects represented a separate evolution from a common ancestor, Old Norse.

=== Early 19th century beginnings ===
The dissolution of Denmark–Norway occurred in the era of the emerging European nation states. In accordance with the principles of romantic nationalism, legitimacy was given to the young and still-forming nation of Norway by way of its history and culture, including the Norwegian language. Norwegian writers gradually adopted distinctly Norwegian vocabulary in their work. Henrik Wergeland may have been the first to do so; but it was the collected folk tales by Jørgen Moe and Peter Christen Asbjørnsen that created a distinct Norwegian written style. This created some opposition from the conservatives, most notably from the poet Johan Sebastian Welhaven. The influential playwright Henrik Ibsen was inspired by the nationalistic movement, but in his later writings he wrote mostly in standard Danish, probably out of concern for his Danish audience.

By 1866, Danish clergyman Andreas Listov (1817–1889) found it necessary to publish a book of about 3,000 terms that needed translation from Norwegian to Danish. Though most of these terms were probably taken straight from Aasmund Olavsson Vinje's travel accounts, the publication reflected a widespread recognition that much written Norwegian no longer was pure Danish.

=== Initial reforms and advocacy ===
By the mid-19th century, two Norwegian linguistic pioneers had started the work that would influence the linguistic situation to this day. Ivar Aasen, autodidact, polyglot, and the founder of modern Norwegian linguistics, studied first the dialects of Sunnmøre, his home district, and then the structure of Norwegian dialects in general. He was one of the first to describe the evolution from Old Norse to Modern Norwegian. From this he moved to advocate and design a distinctly Norwegian written language he termed Landsmål, "language of the country". His work was based on two important principles, in morphology he chose forms which he regarded as common denominators from which contemporary varieties could be inferred, in lexicography he applied puristic principles and excluded words of Danish or Middle Low German descent when at least some dialects had preserved synonyms inherited from Old Norse. In 1885, Landsmål was adopted as an official written language alongside the Norwegian version of Danish.

Knud Knudsen, a teacher, worked instead to adapt the orthography more closely to the spoken Dano-Norwegian koiné known as "cultivated daily speech" (dannet dagligtale). He argued that the cultivated daily speech was the best basis for a distinct Norwegian written language, because the educated classes did not belong to any specific region, they were numerous, and possessed cultural influence. Knudsen was also influenced by and a proponent of the common Dano-Norwegian movement for phonemic orthography. The written form of Norwegian based on his work eventually became known as Riksmål, a term introduced by the author Bjørnstjerne Bjørnson in 1899. The prefix riks- is used in words denoting "belonging to a (or the) country"; Riksmål means "state language".

As a result of Knudsen's work, the Parliament of Norway passed the first orthographical reforms in 1862, most of which also had its proponents in Denmark. Though modest in comparison to subsequent reforms, it nevertheless marked a legislative step toward a distinct written standard for Norway. Silent e's were eliminated from written Norwegian (faa rather than faae), double vowels were no longer used to denote long vowels, k replaced the use of c, q, and ch in most words, and ph was eliminated in favor of f.

Around 1870, x was replaced by ks.

Such orthographic reforms continued in subsequent years, but in 1892 the Norwegian department of education approved the first set of optional forms in the publication of Nordahl Rolfsen's Reader for the Primary School (Læsebog for Folkeskolen). Also, in 1892, national legislation gave each local school board the right to decide whether to teach its children Riksmål or Landsmål.

In 1907, linguistic reforms were extended to include not just orthography but also grammar. The characteristic Norwegian "hard" consonants (p, t, k) replaced Danish "soft" consonants (b, d, g) in writing; consonants were doubled to denote short vowels; words that in Norwegian were monosyllabic were spelled that way; and conjugations related to the neuter grammatical gender were adapted to common Norwegian usage in cultivated daily speech.

In 1913 Olaf Bull's crime novel Mit navn er Knoph (My name is Knoph) became the first piece of Norwegian literature to be translated from Riksmål into Danish for Danish readers, thereby emphasizing that Riksmål was by now a separate language.

=== Controversy erupts ===
In 1906, prominent writers of Landsmål formed an association to promote their version of written Norwegian, calling themselves Noregs Mållag; a year later, the corresponding organization to promote Riksmål was founded, naming itself Riksmålsforbundet. The formation of these organizations coincided with the rule that all incoming university students—those who passed examen artium—had to demonstrate mastery of both for admission to university programs. They had to write a second additional essay in the Norwegian language that was not their primary language.

In 1911, the writer Gabriel Scott's comedic play Tower of Babel had its premiere in Oslo. It is about a small town in eastern Norway that is overtaken by proponents of Landsmål who take to executing all those who resist their language. The play culminates in the Landsmål proponents killing each other over what to call their country: Noregr, Thule, Ultima, Ny-Norig, or Nyrig. The last line is spoken by a country peasant who, seeing the carnage, says: "Good thing I didn't take part in this!".

There was at least one brawl in the audience during the play's run, and the stage was set for a linguistic schism that would characterize Norwegian politics to this day.

To confuse matters further, Eivind Berggrav, Halvdan Koht, and Didrik Arup Seip formed a third organization called Østlandsk reisning that sought to increase the representation, as it were, of Eastern Norwegian dialects in Landsmål, since they felt Aasen's language was overly influenced by the dialects of Western Norway.

=== 1917 reforms and their aftermath ===
In 1917, the Norwegian parliament passed the first major standard for both Norwegian languages. The standard for Riksmål was for the most part a continuation of the 1907 reforms and added some optional forms that were closer to Norwegian dialects, but those for Landsmål sought to reduce forms that were considered idiosyncratic for Western Norway.

As it turned out, the reforms within Riksmål themselves caused controversy—between those who held that the written language should closely approximate the formal language of the educated elite on the one hand, and those who held that it should reflect the everyday language of commoners on the other. A distinction was made between "conservative" and "radical" Riksmål. This added a further political dimension to the debate that opened for a possible convergence between more liberal forms of Landsmål and radical forms of Riksmål. This was to form the basis for the notion of Samnorsk, a synthesis—yet to be realized—of the two main streams of written Norwegian.

By 1921, school districts had made their choice in the growing controversy: 2,000 taught Landsmål as the primary written language; 2,550 the radical form of Riksmål, and 1,450 conservative Riksmål. In 1920, national authorities decided that the issue of language should be put to voters in local referendums, which brought the dispute to a local level where it was no less contentious. In Eidsvoll Municipality, for example, a local banker (Gudbrand Bræk, the father of Ola Skjåk Bræk) was threatened with being run out of town over his support for Samnorsk.

=== New place-names ===
Already in the late 19th century, place names in Norway started changing, ideally to reflect what they were called by their residents. In 1917, 188 municipalities were renamed; all counties were given new names in 1918; and several of the largest cities were renamed in the 1920s; notably Kristiania became Oslo and Fredrikshald became Halden, for example. Some of these changes were less popular. For example, some residents of Sandviken were none too pleased about the "radical" change to Sandvika, nor were many in nearby Fornebo willing to accept Fornebu. The greatest controversy erupted over the city of Trondheim, which had until then been known as Trondhjem, but in the Middle Ages era had been called Nidaros. After the authorities had decided—without consulting the population—that the city should be renamed Nidaros, a compromise was eventually reached, with Trondheim.

=== The Grimstad case and the spoken language in schools ===
In 1911, the Kristiansund school board circulated among its teachers a document that required that their oral instruction had to be in the same language as the district's written language, in this case Riksmål. A teacher, Knut Grimstad, refused to accept this on the grounds that neither the school district nor the Norwegian national authorities had the right to impose a version of a spoken language of instruction. He found support in the 1878 resolution that required that all students—"as much as possible"—should receive instruction in a language close to their native tongue. This was subsequently clarified to mean that they were supposed to be taught in "the Norwegian language", a phrase also open to interpretation.

Grimstad was forced to apologize for the form of his protest, but the issue nevertheless came up in parliament in 1912. This became one of the first political challenges for the new Konow cabinet, falling under the auspices of Edvard Appoloniussen Liljedahl, the minister of churches and education. Liljedahl was a respected and dyed-in-the-wool member of the Landsmål camp, having actually addressed the parliament in his native dialect from Sogn. For his rebuke of Grimstad's position, he was vilified by his own. Trying to find a compromise, his department confirmed the principle of teaching in the "local common spoken language" while also requiring that they be "taught in the language decided for their written work". This now provoked the ire of the Riksmål camp.

Parliament and the department hoped that this clarification would put the issue to rest, but in 1923, the school board in Bergen decided that the spoken language in all its schools would be Riksmål. Olav Andreas Eftestøl (1863-1930), the school director for this region—there were seven such appointees for the entire country—took this decision to the department in 1924, and another parliamentary debate ensued. Eftestøl's view was endorsed, and this put an end to the discussion about spoken language in schools, although it took longer before native speakers of Sami and Kven got the same rights; the issue has re-emerged recently with respect to immigrant children's native language.

=== The Labour Party and the reforms of 1938 ===
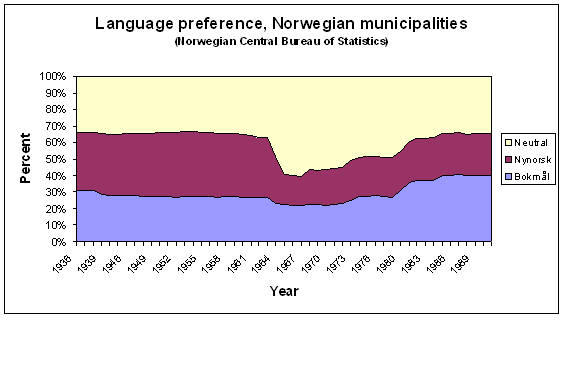
Municipal adoption of languages

The ascent of the Norwegian Labour Party turned out to be decisive in passing the 1917 reforms, and one Labour politician—Halvdan Koht—was in the early 1920s asked to develop the party's political platform for the Norwegian language.

Koht was for some years both the chairman of Noregs Mållag and Østlandsk reisning and immersed on the issue of language. He published his findings in 1921 and framed them in a decidedly political context.

His view, which was to gain currency among his fellow Labourites, was that the urban working class and rural farming class had a convergence of interests in language, giving rise to the emergent "people's language" (folkemålet). He wrote that "The struggle for the people's language is the cultural side of the labor movement." This notion of convergence led the Labour Party to embrace the ideal of a synthesis of the two main languages into one language, built on the spoken forms of the "common person", or Samnorsk.

Having already changed the names of the languages—Riksmål became Bokmål and Landsmål Nynorsk—by parliamentary resolution of 1929, the Labour party made Koht their thought leader and spokesperson on these issues, formalizing his views into their platform.

The 1938 reforms, proposed under the first durable Labour cabinet of Johan Nygaardsvold, represented a radical departure from previous reforms.

- Bokmål
  - The forms common in cultivated daily speech (dannet dagligtale) lost their normative status in Bokmål and instead became one of several factors.
  - A new distinction was made: between primary and secondary forms, in which preference would be given to primary forms, which usually were more "radical."
  - Some forms found in conservative Riksmål/Bokmål were outright rejected. For examples, diphthong spelling became mandatory; and a number of feminine words had to be declined with an -a rather than -en.
- Nynorsk
  - Preference was given to "broad" rather than "narrow" root vowels, e.g., mellom rather than millom.
  - The -i suffix was set aside for the -a suffix in most cases, removing a form many found idiosyncratic to Western Norway.

The reforms clearly aspired to bring the two languages closer together and predictably angered advocates in each camp. In particular, the proponents of Riksmål felt the reforms were a frontal assault on their written language and sensibilities, since many elements of their previous norm—dannet dagligtale—were deprecated. However, purists in the Landsmål camp were also unhappy, feeling that the reforms gutted their language.

=== World War II ===
The occupation of Norway by Nazi Germany from 1940 to 1945 took the language issue off the national political scene. The Quisling government rescinded the 1938 reforms and made some changes of its own, but as with virtually everything Quisling did, this was rendered null and void by the post-war Norwegian government.

=== Liberation, and the debate intensifies ===
As it turned out, the war set the Nynorsk movement back substantially. The momentum gained by the Labour party's activism for Nynorsk was lost during the war, and Noregs Mållag's entire archive was lost in 1944. An opinion poll in 1946 showed that 79% of all Norwegians favored the formation of Samnorsk, setting further back the cause of the purists who favored the traditional Landsmål forms.

On the other side of the issue, the poet Arnulf Øverland galvanized Riksmålsforbundet in opposition not to Nynorsk, which he respected, but against the radical Bokmål recommended by the 1938 reforms. Their efforts were particularly noted in Oslo, where the school board had decided to make radical forms of Bokmål the norm in 1939 (Oslo-vedtaket). In 1951, concerned parents primarily from the affluent western neighborhoods of Oslo organized the "parents' campaign against Samnorsk" (foreldreaksjonen mot samnorsk), which in 1953 included "correcting" textbooks.

In 1952, Øverland and Riksmålsforbundet published the so-called "blue list" that recommended more conservative orthography and forms than most of the 1938 reforms. This book established for the first time a real alternative standard in Riksmål to legislated Bokmål. It set the standard for two of the capital's main daily newspapers, Aftenposten and Morgenbladet. It also contributed to the reversal of the "Oslo decision" in 1954.

In 1951, the Norwegian parliament established by law Norsk språknemnd, which later was renamed Norsk språkråd (Norwegian Language Council). Riksmålsforeningen disagreed with the premises of the council's mandate, namely that Norwegian was to be built on the basis of the "people's language". The council was convened with 30 representatives, 15 from each of the main languages. However, most of them supported Samnorsk.

In 1952, a minor reform passed with little fanfare and controversy: in spoken official Norwegian, numbers over 20 were to be articulated with the tens first, e.g., "twenty-one" as is the Swedish and English practice rather than "one-and-twenty", the previous practice also found in Danish and German.

=== The apex of the controversy and the 1959 textbook reform ===
Arnulf Øverland, who had so successfully energized the Riksmål movement after the war, did not see Nynorsk as the nemesis of his cause. Rather, he appealed to the Nynorsk movement to join forces against the common enemy he found in Samnorsk. By several accounts, however, much of the activism within the Riksmål camp was directed against all "radical" tendencies, including Nynorsk.

The use of Bokmål and Nynorsk in the government-controlled Norwegian Broadcasting Corporation (NRK) came under a particular scrutiny. As a government agency (and monopoly) that has traditionally been strongly associated with the Nynorsk-supporting Norwegian Labour Party, NRK was required to include both languages in its broadcasts. According to their own measurements, well over 80% was in Bokmål and less than 20% Nynorsk. Still, the Riksmål advocates were outraged, since they noted that some of the most popular programs (such as the 7 pm news) were broadcast in Nynorsk, and the Bokmål was too radical in following the 1938 norms.

This came to a head in the case of Sigurd Smebye, a meteorologist who insisted on using highly conservative Riksmål terms in reporting the weather. This ended up on the parliamentary floor, where the minister had to assure the public that anyone was entitled to use his/her own dialect on the air. However, Smebye was effectively disallowed from performing on television and ended up suing and prevailing over NRK in a supreme court case.

At the same time, one of the announcers for children's radio shows complained that her texts had been corrected from Riksmål to 1938-Bokmål, e.g., from Dukken lå i sengen sin på gulvet to Dokka lå i senga si på golvet. With the 1959 reforms, the issue seems to have been resolved—everyone in NRK could use their own natural spoken language.

As its first major work, the language council published in 1959 new standards for textbooks. The purpose of a unified standard was to avoid multiple versions of standard books to accommodate "moderate", "radical", and "conservative" versions of the languages. The standard was by its nature a continuation of the convergence movement toward the ever-elusive goal of Samnorsk. Double consonants to denote short vowels are put in common use; the silent "h" is eliminated in a number of words; more "radical" forms in Bokmål are made primary; while Nynorsk actually offers more choices.

However, it appeared that the 1959 attempt was the last gasp of the Samnorsk movement. After this, the Norwegian Labour Party decided to depoliticize language issues by commissioning expert panels on linguistic issues.

=== "Language peace" ===
In January 1964, a committee was convened by Helge Sivertsen, minister of education, with Professor Hans Vogt as its chair. It was variously known as the "Vogt committee" or "language peace committee" (språkfredskomitéen). Its purpose was to defuse the conflict about language in Norway and build an atmosphere of mutual respect.

The committee published its findings in 1966, pointing out that:

- Nynorsk was in decline in the nation's school districts, now tracking toward 20% of all primary school students
- The written language was in any event increasing its influence over the Norwegian language, as the differences between dialects were gradually eroding
- Even with the disputes over the matter, there was no question that Nynorsk and Bokmål had come closer to each other in the last 50 years
- The literary forms in Norwegian literature (i.e., Riksmål used by prominent writers) should not be neglected or disowned

These findings were subject to hearings and discussions in coming years in a decidedly more deliberate form than before; and a significant outcome was the Norsk språknemnd became Norsk språkråd, responsible less for prescribing language than for cultivating it. Still, the Vogt committee promoted convergence as a virtue.

=== Nynorsk finds new favour in the 1960s and 1970s ===
The Norwegian countercultural movement and the emergence of the New Left sought to disassociate itself from the conservative establishment in many ways, including language. At the universities, students were encouraged to "speak their dialect, write Nynorsk", and radical forms of Bokmål were adopted by urban left-wing socialists.

The first debate on Norwegian EU membership leading to the 1972 referendum gave new meaning to rural culture and dialects. The Nynorsk movement gained new momentum, putting rural districts and the dialects more in the center of Norwegian politics.

In 1973, Norsk språkråd instructed teachers to no longer correct students who used conservative Riksmål in their writing, provided these forms were used consistently.

=== The end of Samnorsk ===
The 1973 recommendation by the council was formally approved by parliament in 1981 in what was known as the "liberalization resolution" (liberaliseringsvedtaket). With the exception of a few "banner words" (Riksmål nu rather than Bokmål nå ("now"), efter rather than etter ("after"), sne rather than snø ("snow"), and sprog rather than språk ("language"), traditional Riksmål forms were fully accepted in contemporary Bokmål, though all the radical forms were retained.

On 13 December 2002 the Samnorsk ideal was finally officially abandoned when the Ministry of Culture and Church affairs sent out a press release to that effect. The primary motivation for this change in policy was the emerging consensus that government policy should not prohibit forms that are in active use and had a strong basis in the body of Norwegian literary work.

This was further formalized in the so-called 2005 reforms that primarily affected orthography for Bokmål. So-called secondary forms (sideformer) were abolished. These forms were variant spellings that would be tolerated by the general public, but disallowed among textbook authors and public officials. The 2005 changes now gave all allowable forms equal standing. These changes effectively recognize approximately full usage of Riksmål forms.

== Urban/rural divide ==
In modern Norway, many of the largest urban centres' municipal governments have chosen to declare themselves neutral. However, it can be seen that several large centres have formally adopted the use of Bokmål, and very few larger urban centres use Nynorsk exclusively:

Largest urban centres by language declaration

Neutral
Urban centres	Population
Oslo	1,098,061
Bergen	272,125
Stavanger/Sandnes	239,055
Trondheim	198,777
Drammen	124,540
Porsgrunn/Skien	96,695
Kristiansand	67,372
Tønsberg	55,939
Ålesund	55,684
Moss	50,214
Bodø	43,322
Tromsø	42,782

Bokmål
Urban centres	Population
Fredrikstad/Sarpsborg	121,679
Haugesund	47,020
Sandefjord	46,926
Arendal	45,332
Halden	26,255
Lillehammer	21,468

Nynorsk
Urban centres	Population
Leirvik	14,720
Osøyro	14,621
Bryne	13,312
Knarrevik/Straume	12,353
Førde	10,535
Kleppe/Verdalen	9,922
Florø	9,015
Kvernaland	7,959
Ørsta	7,568
Vossevangen	7,200

== Future evolution of Norwegian ==
The Samnorsk issue turned out to be fateful for two generations of amateur and professional linguists in Norway and flared up into a divisive political issue from time to time. By letting Bokmål be Bokmål (or Riksmål) and Nynorsk being Nynorsk, the Norwegian government allowed each—in principle—to develop on its own.

As Norwegian society has integrated more with the global economy and European cosmopolitanism, the effect on both written and spoken Norwegian is evident. There is a greater prevalence of English loan words in Norwegian, and some view this with great concern.

In 2004, the Norwegian Language Council issued Norwegian orthography for 25 originally English language words, suggesting that for example "bacon" be spelled beiken. This was in keeping with previous practices that made stasjon the Norwegian writing for "station", etc. The so-called "beiken reforms" were not well received by the general public, and beiken was one of the spelling changes that was voted down.

There is also a trend, which has been ongoing since the dissolution of the Dano-Norwegian Union in 1814, to assimilate individual Swedish loan words into Norwegian. Although it lost momentum substantially after the dissolution of the union between Norway and Sweden in 1905, it has remained an ongoing phenomenon of Norwegian linguistics. Indeed, the prominent Norwegian linguist Finn-Erik Vinje characterizes this influx since the Second World War as a breaking wave.

There is further a concern in some quarters that poor grammar and usage are becoming more commonplace in the written press and broadcast media, and consequently among students and the general population. While the sociolinguistic view that language constantly evolves is duly noted among these critics, there is some call for more vigilance in written language. Broadcast programs such as Typisk norsk and Språkteigen are intended to raise the general awareness of the Norwegian language; philologist and former director of Språkrådet Sylfest Lomheim is working to make language issues more visible.

== See also ==
- Faroese language conflict
- Comparison of Norwegian Bokmål and Standard Danish
- Spynorsk mordliste
- Greek language question—a similar dispute in Greece that is now resolved

== Sources and bibliography ==
- Petter Wilhelm Schjerven (ed.): Typisk Norsk, Oslo, NRK/Dinamo forlag. ISBN 82-525-6160-8.
- Egil Børre Johnsen (ed.): Vårt eget språk, Aschehoug. ISBN 82-03-17092-7.
- Oddmund Løkensgard Hoel: Nasjonalisme i norsk målstrid 1848–1865, Oslo, 1996, Noregs Forskingsråd. ISBN 82-12-00695-6.
