= Olaus Dons Schmidt =

Norwegian genealogist (1865–1969)

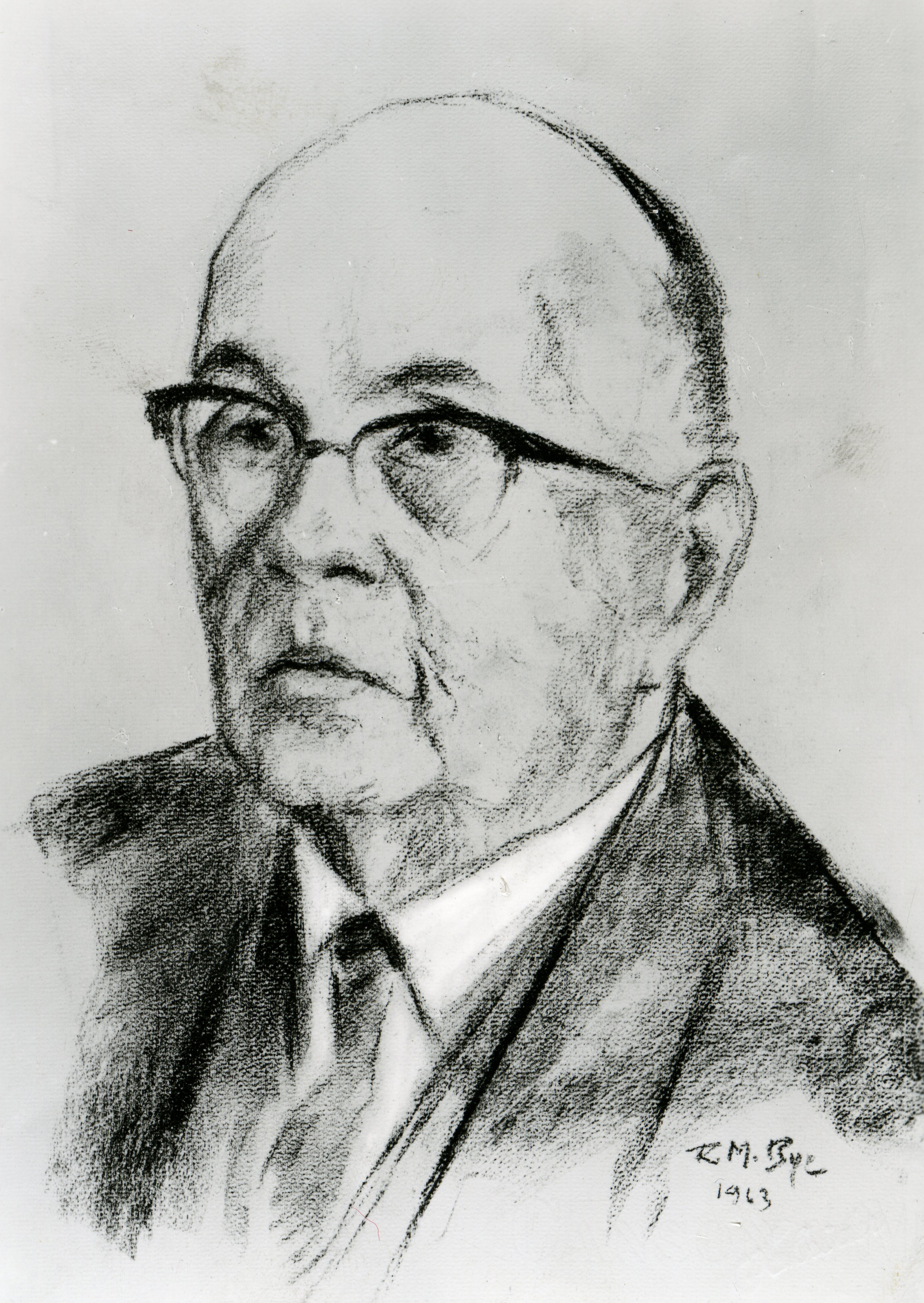
Portrait of Olaus Dons Schmidt

Olaus Dons Schmidt (8 November 1895 – 28 April 1969) was a Norwegian genealogist.

He was born in Trondhjem as a son of trader Johan Christian Ludvig Schmidt (1850–1919) and Inga Cecilie Broström (1858–1919). In 1925 he married engineer's daughter Hildur Synnøve Strøm from Hamar.

He took middle school, started training in the postal service in 1913 and spent his entire career as a postal clerk in Trondhjem. On the side, however, he was a productive genealogical and historical writer. His main genealogical work was Familien Schive in 1917. He contributed extensively to the journals Slektshistorisk Tidsskrift and Personalhistorisk Tidsskrift and to the biographical dictionary Norsk Biografisk Leksikon. From 1944 he was a fellow of the Royal Norwegian Society of Sciences and Letters. He also wrote tens of historical books on companies and institutions in the Trondhjem region, beginning with the 100-year-history of Trondhjem Stock Exchange in 1919 and ending with some posthumous releases where other authors built upon his work.

He chaired the Trondhjems Historical Association and the gentlemen's club Klubbselskapet Harmonien, and was a board member of Selskabet for Trondhjems Bys Vel. He died in April 1969.
