= Knud Knudsen (linguist) =

Norwegian educator, author, linguist and philologist (1812–1895)

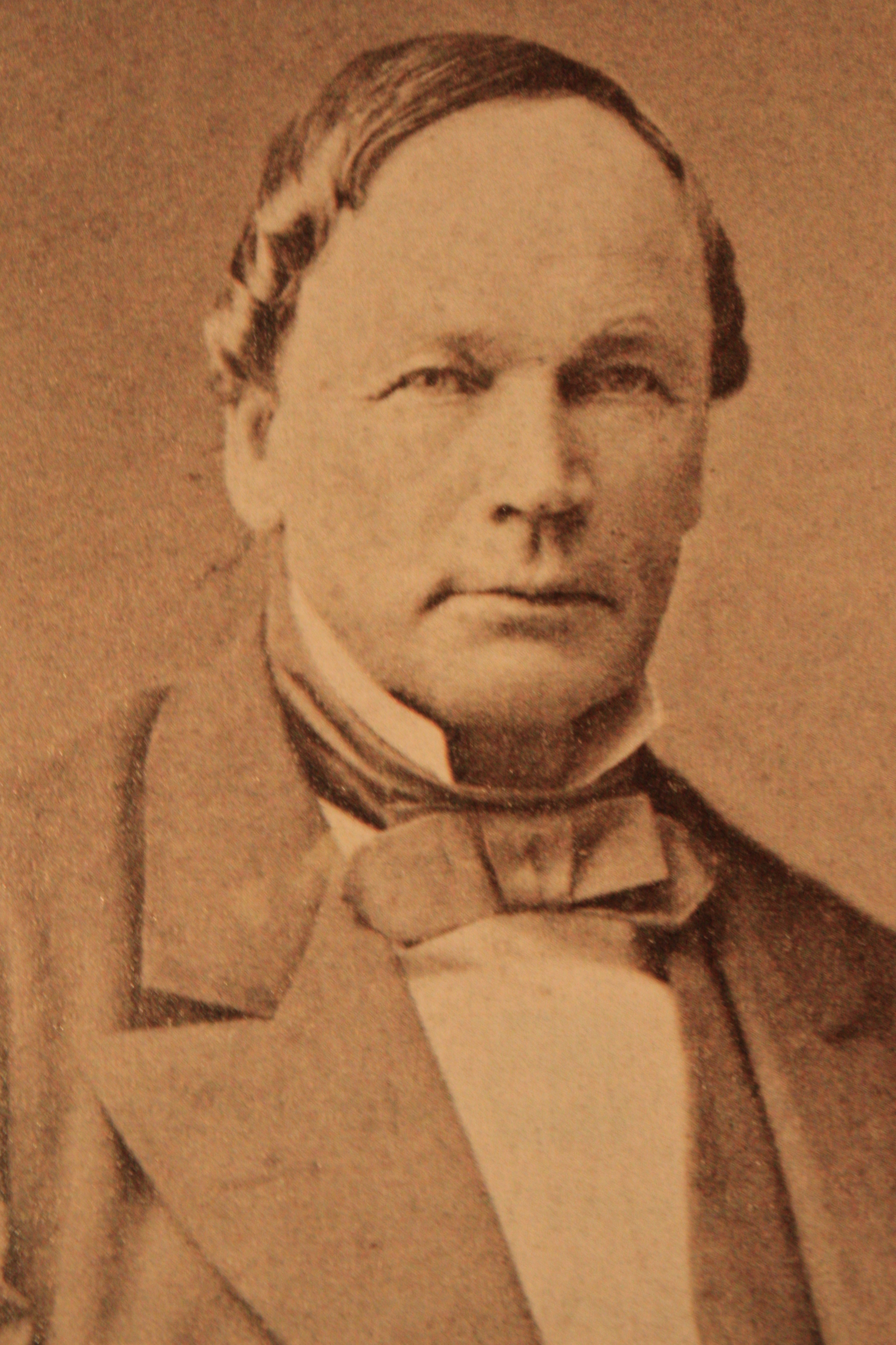
- Born: January 6, 1812; Tvedestrand, Nedenes, Norway
- Died: March 30, 1895 (aged 83)
- Education: University of Oslo
- Occupations: educator, author, linguist, philologist
- Writing career
- Language: Norwegian

Knud Knudsen (January 6, 1812 – March 30, 1895) was a Norwegian educator, author, linguist and philologist, known as "The Father of Bokmål". He is best known for having assembled Bokmål, one of the two official written versions of the Norwegian language, from Dano-Norwegian.

== Biography ==
Knud Knudsen was born at Tvedestrand in Nedenes, Norway. He was first adjunct professor in Drammen until 1846, when he was appointed headmaster at the Christiania Cathedral School, a position he held until 1880.

Knudsen became involved in the development of the national debate which resulted in the Riksmål (later Bokmål) and Landsmål (later Nynorsk) forms of the written Norwegian language. As an educator, he had observed that students had difficulty writing in the Danish language, when they spoke the Norwegian language. He came to believe that the written language should be changed to match common speech. In this regard, Knudsen came to exercise influence among his contemporaries, including Bjørnstjerne Bjørnson.

Knudsen was one of the first to propose Norwegianization (fornorskninglinjen), the rewriting of loanwords into a Norwegian spelling (e.g., turning chauffeur into sjåfør). His aim was to give a more Norwegian coloring to the literary language of Norway by adapting the orthography and syntax to Norwegian usage, and by substituting wherever it was possible, Norwegian words for foreign derivatives. He wanted changes that could occur in the shortest time possible and consequently put forward several reforms working within the Danish written language. The most comprehensive treatment of the subject may be found in his Unorsk og norsk, eller Fremmedords avlösning (1879–1881).

== Selected works ==
- Haandbog i dansk-norsk sproglære (1856)
- Er norsk det samme som dansk? (1862)
- Modersmaalet som skolefag (1864)
- Det norske maal-stræv (1867)
- Nogle spraak- og skolespörgsmaal (1869)
- Den landsgyldige norske uttale (1876)
- Unorsk og norsk eller fremmede ords avlösning, (1879–1881)
- Af maalstriden 1881 (1881)
- Norsk blandkorn (3 samlingar, 1882–1885)
- Latinskole uten latin (1884)
- Hvem skal vinne? (1886)
- Tyskhet i norsk og dansk (1888).
- Norsk maalvekst fra 1852 å regne (1894)

== See also ==
- Norwegian language conflict

== Other sources ==
- Vinje, Finn-Erik (1978) Et språk i utvikling: noen hovedlinjer i norsk språkhistorie fra reformasjonen til våre dager (Oslo: Aschehoug) ISBN 8203115241
- Hyvik, Jens Johan (2009) Språk Og Nasjon 1739-1868. Norsk Målreising. Band I (Det Norske Samlaget) ISBN 9788252174458

== Related reading ==
- Haugen, Einar (1966) Language Conflict & Language Planning- The Case of Modern Norwegian (Harvard University Press)
- Jahr, Ernst (2014) Language Planning as a Sociolinguistic Experiment: The Case of Modern Norwegian (Edinburgh University Press) ISBN 978-0748637829
