= Dano-Norwegian =

Extinct North Germanic language

- Danish-Norwegian
- dansk-norsk
- Region: Denmark-Norway and independent Norway
- Era: 18th–19th century
- Language family: Indo-European: Germanic; North Germanic; East Scandinavian; Danish; Dano-Norwegian
- Early forms: Proto-Norse: Old Norse; Old East Norse; Early Old Danish; Late Old Danish
- Writing system: Latin

Language codes
- ISO 639-3: None (mis)
- Glottolog: None
- IETF: da-NO

Dano-Norwegian (Danish and Norwegian: dansk-norsk) was a koiné/mixed language that evolved among the urban elite in Norwegian cities during the later years of the union between the Kingdoms of Denmark and Norway (1536/1537–1814). It is from this koiné that the unofficial written standard Riksmål and the official written standard Bokmål developed. Bokmål is now the most widely used written standard of contemporary Norwegian.

== History ==
=== As a spoken language ===
During the period when Norway was in a union with Denmark, Norwegian writing died out and Danish became the language of the literate class in Norway. At first, Danish was used primarily in writing; later it came to be spoken on formal or official occasions; and by the time Norway's ties with Denmark were severed in 1814, a Dano-Norwegian vernacular often called the "cultivated everyday speech" had become the mother tongue of parts of the urban elite. This new Dano-Norwegian koiné could be described as Danish with Norwegian pronunciation, some Norwegian vocabulary, and some minor grammatical differences from Danish.

=== As a written language ===
In the late middle ages and early modern age, the Scandinavian languages went through great changes, as they were influenced in particular by Low German. Written Danish language mostly found its modern form in the 17th century, based on the vernacular of the educated classes of Copenhagen. At the time, Copenhagen was the capital of Denmark–Norway, and Danish was used as an official written language in Norway at the time of the dissolution of the Dano-Norwegian union in 1814. In Norway it was generally referred to as Norwegian, particularly after the dissolution of the Dano-Norwegian union.

During the 19th century, spoken Dano-Norwegian language gradually came to incorporate more of Norwegian vocabulary and grammar. At the start of the 20th century, written Dano-Norwegian was mostly identical with written Danish, with only minor differences, such as some additional Norwegian vocabulary in Dano-Norwegian. In 1907 and 1917, spelling and grammar reforms brought the written language closer to the spoken koiné (Dano-Norwegian). Based on the Danish model, the Dano-Norwegian language in Norway was referred to as Rigsmål, later spelled Riksmål, from the late 19th century, and this name was officially adopted in the early 20th century. In 1929, the name Riksmål was officially changed to Bokmål after a proposition to use the name dansk-norsk lost with a single vote in the Lagting (a chamber in the Norwegian parliament).

In the mid-19th century, a new written language, Landsmål, based on selected rural Norwegian dialects, was launched as an alternative to Dano-Norwegian, but it did not replace the existing written language. Landsmål, renamed Nynorsk, is currently used by around 12% of the population, mostly in western Norway; it had reached its height in the 1940s. The Norwegian language conflict is an ongoing controversy within Norwegian culture and politics related to these two official versions of the Norwegian language.

The official policy during most of the 20th century was to create a combined version of the two variants (Nynorsk and Bokmål), called Samnorsk. Gradual changes in the spelling and grammatical rules in both forms were introduced several times in order to make these variants more similar. Eventually, the idea of Samnorsk was abandoned. However, the spelling and grammar reforms had a lasting effect on the languages.

== Modern developments ==
Bokmål, in contemporary times, is primarily recognized as a written language, and in part refers its pronunciation in media, theatre, and so forth. Distinct spoken varieties of Norwegian closely resemble Bokmål. Notably, a conservative form akin to historical Dano-Norwegian is observed in higher sociolects in Oslo and other Eastern Norwegian cities.

In Eastern Norway, a less socially distinct variant, known as standard østnorsk (Standard East Norwegian), is gaining prominence as the spoken standard. This variant is colloquially termed the Oslo dialect, a misnomer since the original Oslo dialect predates and differs from the Dano-Norwegian koiné. While influenced by standard østnorsk, the traditional Oslo dialect persists alongside the newer standard. Over time, the spoken Dano-Norwegian standard, its successors, and Modern Norwegian dialects have mutually influenced each other, blurring the lines between them.

The application of the term Dano-Norwegian to contemporary Bokmål and its spoken forms is rare. The language's national identity has sparked extensive debate. Users and advocates often reject the implied Danish association, preferring neutral terms like Riksmål (state language) and Bokmål (literary language). This debate intensified with the emergence of Nynorsk in the 19th century, a Norwegian written language rooted in Modern Norwegian dialects and opposing Danish and Dano-Norwegian influences.

Nynorsk supporters have historically argued that Nynorsk is the sole authentic Norwegian language, viewing Riksmål/Bokmål as remnants of the dual monarchy. Consequently, labeling Bokmål as Dano-Norwegian can be seen as stigmatizing. While many Bokmål users find this association offensive, it is prevalent in Nynorsk-centric discussions. Nevertheless, some sources, like the Encyclopaedia Britannica, acknowledge Bokmål as an extension of Dano-Norwegian: "In its current form Dano-Norwegian is the predominant language of Norway’s population of more than 4.6 million."

== See also ==
- Gøtudanskt
- Svorsk
