= Christian Friele =

Norwegian newspaper editor

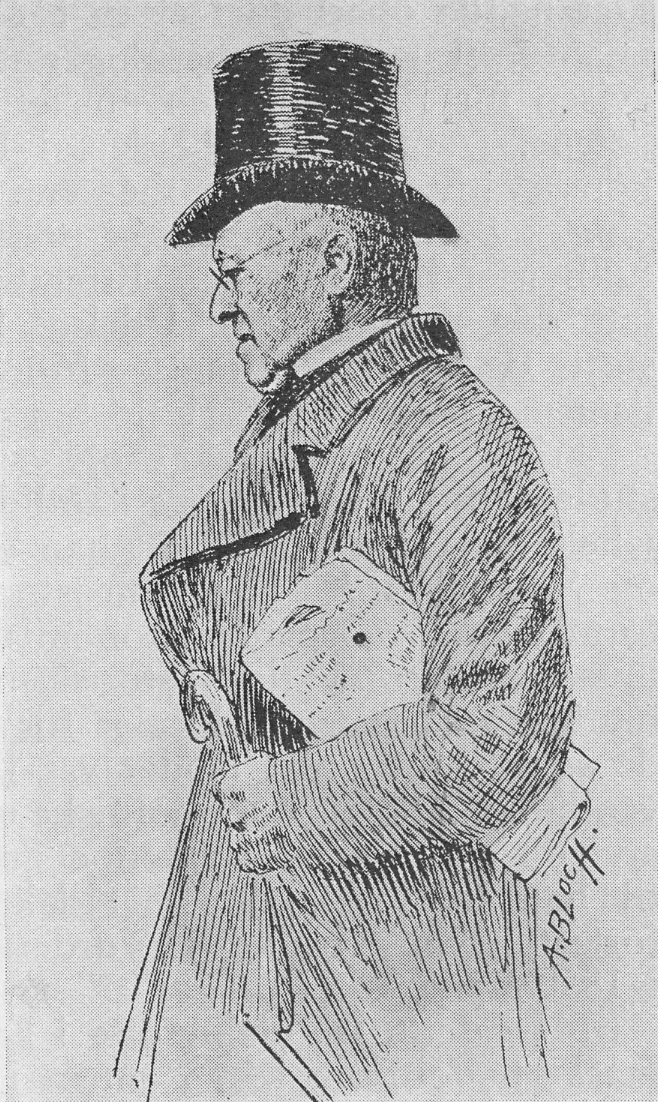
Christian Friele, drawing by Andreas Bloch

Christian Frederik Gotfried Friele (22 May 1821 – 24 January 1899) was a Norwegian newspaper editor. Born in Bergen to a prosperous family, he received a deficient education, but managed nevertheless to find his way into the conservative Morgenbladet newspaper. As its editor-in-chief, he became known for his wit and sharp-tongued remarks; he ruthlessly derided key contemporary political figures as "clerical lutefisk" and "royal stable jacks". In the 1884 impeachment case against Prime Minister Christian August Selmer, Friele sided with Selmer, and retreated from his position as editor of Morgenbladet following the court's verdict. Firmly believing that orders of merit would compromise his integrity as editor, he twice declined the offer of being rewarded the Order of St. Olav.

== Early life and education ==
Friele was born to the merchant Ole Morup Friele (1790–1852) and his wife Louise Engelche Bohr (1797–1869) in the West-Norwegian city of Bergen on 22 May 1821. The family was relatively wealthy; consequently Friele did not experience the wretched living conditions of many of his contemporaries. His birthplace had a profound impact on his later life; the writer and poet Johan Sebastian Welhaven – also from Bergen – taught him how to fine-tune Bergen-style sarcasms, for which Friele became feared in his later editorship.

He enrolled in law studies in 1838, at the age of 17. A not very assiduous student, he used 13 years to collect his law diploma – other students typically took three to four years. During his studies he befriended the playwright Henrik Ibsen and the author Bjørnstjerne Bjørnson – the former he was allowed to address with the informal second-person pronoun Du. Despite his long tuition, Friele was not considered erudite by his contemporaries; rumor had it that he had never read a book or seen a play.

== Marriage and editorship ==
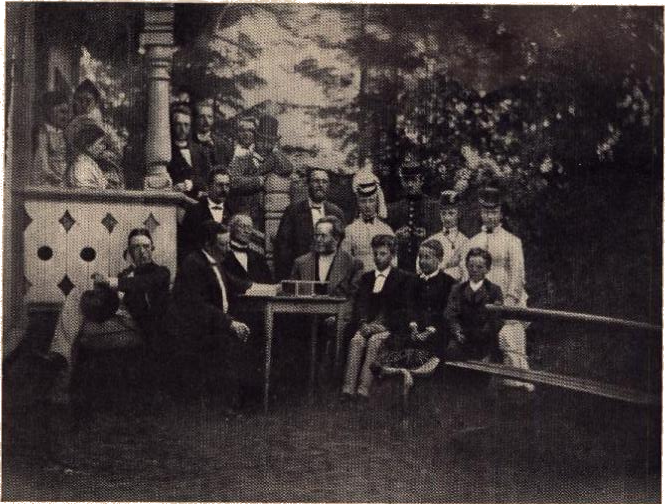
A party at Sarabråten in 1874; Friele is seated to the left of Henrik Ibsen

Upon finishing his law studies, he was employed as a journalist for the Christiania-Posten newspaper. In 1854 he succeeded Bjørnson as parliamentary referee of Morgenbladet; this change of roles angered Bjørnson, who later would write a scornful play directed at Friele. On 12 December 1860, Friele married Marie Cathrine Lasson (1827–1909), daughter of the jurist Peder Carl Lasson (1798–1873) and his wife Ottilia Pauline Christine von Munthe af Morgenstierne (1804–86); the marriage was happy but childless.

Upon Adolf Bredo Stabell's 1865 death, Friele advanced to the chief editor position in Morgenbladet. During his editorship, which lasted until 1893, he mocked contemporary politicians in his venomous and quick-witted articles; he was known through the city for his sharp pen. His inferior education was however of no hindrance; a biographer once commented: "The inadequacies in his studies gave his beliefs a steadfast grounding they otherwise would have lacked". As editor of Norway's chief conservative organ, Friele championed the politicians of the Stang family and reviled their political adversaries; he once called the liberal politician Ketil Motzfeldt a "polemic Ishmael".

Despite his tendency to ridicule his political enemies, Friele exercised considerable editorial discretion, in the view of his biographer Olaf Gjerløw. Having an aristocratic disdain for gossip, he once rejected an offer to publish a story on a liberal politician's licentiousness. "My esteemed Gentleman, I think the libidos are quite evenly distributed between the parties", he told the tattler. Friele's career as editor culminated with the 1880s impeachment case against Prime Minister Christian August Selmer. The Liberal Party attempted to get rid of the "senior official government" through the legal system; however, it needed 72 mandates to win a majority in the Lagting and call for an impeachment. The party won the subsequent election in a landslide, and proceeded to the court on 18 May 1883. The debate surrounding the impeachment case was dominated by Friele and Bjørnstjerne Bjørnson, the former who devoted page up and page down in Morgenbladet to the proceedings, and the latter who wrote vehement letters from Paris. The whole commotion ended with Selmer being sentenced to leave his office; he stepped down on 8 March. Friele was infuriated, and condemned King Oscar II for an alleged coup d'état. After this defeat, Friele resigned from his editor position in Morgenbladet, curtly stating to his successor Nils Vogt: "Oh my, how this paper regresses". Nevertheless, he kept editing the newspaper until 1893.

== Death and legacy ==
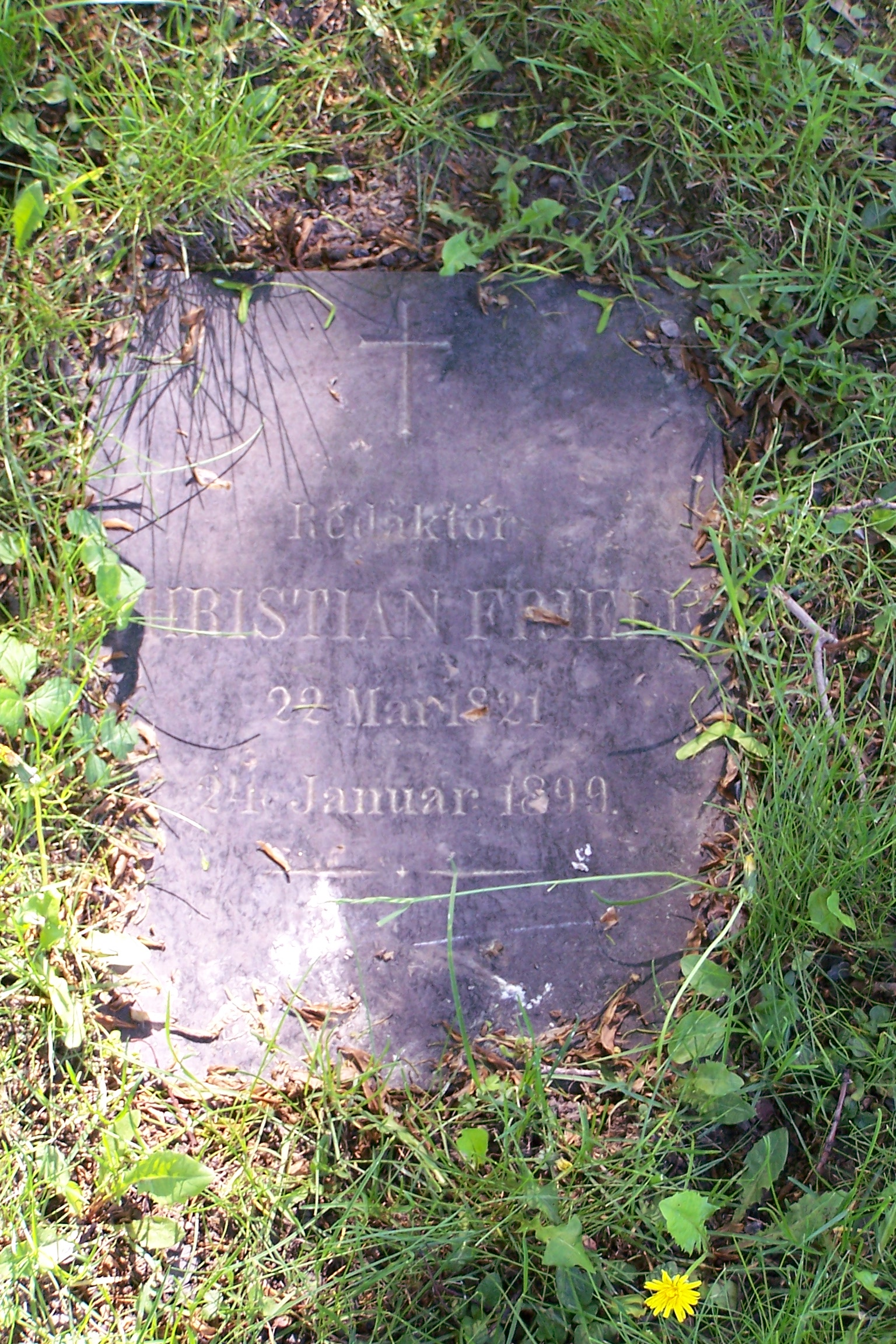
Friele's tomb at Vår Frelsers gravlund

Friele was twice in his life offered a knighthood of the Order of St. Olav; he rejected both offers. The first time he turned down the offer with the words: "Editor of the Royal Norwegian Morgenbladet, what? No safer way to compromise the position of the paper and its editor!"; the second with the words: "Would your Majesty force me to leave the country?".

He died on 24 January 1899 in Kristiania and was buried in Vår Frelsers gravlund together with his wife. Friele as a fictional character was present rather frequently in the contemporary literature: Ibsen's character Daniel Heire has acquired some properties from Friele; Knut Hamsun describes him briefly in Hunger; in Alexander Kielland's Arbeidsfolk he receives contemptuous treatment; and Bjørnson wrote a play titled Redaktøren ("the Editor") in which Friele is the protagonist. The conservative politician C. J. Hambro described him thus:

Men with greater names and with higher status in history are forgotten and will remain so. Christian Friele will be remembered; the memory and the myth have glossed his name and mitigated the sharp echo it once had. He is the first man in Norwegian history who will be remembered for being a journalist.

== Bibliography ==
- Eide, Martin (2001). "Christian Friele". In Helle, Knut (ed.). Norsk biografisk leksikon (in Norwegian). Vol. 3 (2nd ed.). Oslo: Kunnskapsforlaget.
- Fischer, K.; Halvorsen, J.B. (1919). "Friele, Christian Frederik Gotfried". In Blangstrup, Chr. (ed.). Salmonsens Konversationsleksikon (in Danish). Vol. 9 (2nd ed.). Copenhagen: J. H. Schultz.
- Gjerløw, Olaf (1970). "Christian Friele 1812–1899". Norske Presseprofiler (in Norwegian). Vol. 3. Oslo: Aas & Wahls Boktrykkeri / Det Mallingske Boktrykkeri. pp. 41–55. OCLC 186777683.
- Hambro, C.J. (1921). "Redaktør Friele". Mænd og masker (in Norwegian). Kristiania: Aschehoug. pp. 145–58. OCLC 16652123.
- Nerbøvik, Jostein (1999). Norsk historie 1860–1914. Volume five of Norsk historie (in Norwegian) (2nd ed.). Oslo: Det Norske Samlaget. ISBN 82-521-5186-8.
- Sørensen, Øystein (1984). 1880-årene. Ti år som rystet Norge (in Norwegian). Oslo: Universitetsforlaget. ISBN 82-00-06966-4.
