= Riksmål =

Conservative Norwegian written standard language

Norwegian Riksmål
- riksmål
- Pronunciation: Urban East Norwegian: [ˈrɪ̀ksmoːɫ]
- Region: Norway
- Era: 19th century to present
- Language family: Indo-European: Germanic; North Germanic; East Scandinavian; Danish and Norwegian; Dano-Norwegian; Bokmål; Norwegian Riksmål
- Early forms: Old Norse: Old East Norse; Early Old Danish; Late Old Danish; Dano-Norwegian
- Writing system: Latin

Language codes
- ISO 639-1: no
- ISO 639-2: nor
- ISO 639-3: nor
- Glottolog: None

Riksmål (English: /ˈriːksmɔːl/, /ˈrɪk-/, Urban East Norwegian: [ˈrɪ̀ksmoːɫ]) is a conservative written Norwegian language form or spelling standard, meaning the National Language, closely related and now almost identical to the dominant form of Bokmål, known as Moderat Bokmål.

Both Bokmål and Riksmål evolved from the Danish written language as used in Norway during the countries' union and beyond, and from the pronunciation of Danish that became the native language of Norwegian elites by the 18th century. By the late 19th century, the main written language became known as Rigsmål in both Denmark and Norway; the written language in Norway remained identical to Danish until 1907, although it was generally known as "Norwegian" in Norway. From 1907, successive spelling reforms gradually introduced some orthographic differences between written Norwegian and Danish. The name Riksmål was adopted as the official name of the language, to differentiate it from Landsmål (now Nynorsk); in 1929, the name of the official language was changed to Bokmål.

From 1938, spelling reforms introduced by the Labour government met increasing resistance as they were seen as "radical", and language organisations independent of the state started publishing their own spelling standard known as Riksmål. The struggle between Bokmål and Riksmål eventually led to the Norwegian language struggle that was at its most intense in the 1950s and 1960s. As a result, the "Language Peace Committee" was appointed by the government, and subsequent reforms have moved Bokmål and Riksmål closer together, to the extent that few differences remain. Riksmål and Bokmål were clearly separate spelling standards until a major reform of Bokmål in 2005 that (re)introduced numerous Riksmål forms as part of Bokmål; some subsequent reforms in the 21st century have eradicated most remaining, mostly small differences. National librarian Aslak Sira Myhre argued in 2017 that Riksmål in practice has "taken over" Bokmål and peacefully "won" the language struggle.

== History ==
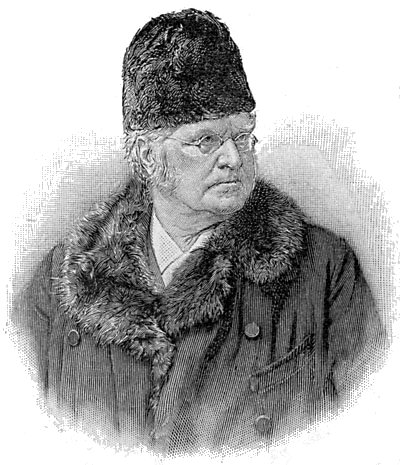
Nobel Prize winner Bjørnstjerne Bjørnson introduced the name "riksmål" in Norway and founded the Riksmål Society.

After the dissolution of the union with Denmark in 1814, Norway had no national language standard of its own, the written language being Danish, while the spoken language consisted of numerous dialects – that to some extent were not mutually intelligible. The new union partner Sweden had a different language, Swedish, and there was a fear that if no measures were taken, its language would be imposed upon the Norwegians.

Hence, prominent Norwegians, such as Henrik Wergeland and Bjørnstjerne Bjørnson, advocated a standardized Norwegian language, to be based on the legacy of the Danish language as used in Norway by the upper class of Christiania (now Oslo) and other Eastern Norwegian cities. This was proposed by Knud Knudsen, a schoolteacher, who had witnessed how schoolchildren struggled with the Danish language they were taught, since it was very different from the spoken language they were used to. However, as late as in 1883 the Danish intellectual Georg Brandes stated that the language in Norway was Danish, and that the Norwegians did not have a language of their own.

=== Introduction by Knud Knudsen ===
Knud Knudsen presented his Norwegian language in several works from the 1850s until his death in 1895, while the term Riksmaal (aa was a contemporary way of writing å) was first proposed by Bjørnstjerne Bjørnson in 1899 as a name for the Norwegian variety of written Danish as well as spoken Dano-Norwegian. It was borrowed from Denmark where it denoted standard written and spoken Danish. The same year the Riksmål movement became organised under his leadership in order to fight against the growing influence of Nynorsk, eventually leading to the foundation of the non-governmental organisation Riksmålsforbundet in 1907. Bjørnson became its first leader, until his death in 1910.

=== Spread ===
Riksmål became the chosen language for Norwegian pupils from the latter part of the 19th century, and Norwegian newspapers adapted to the language. However, many Norwegian authors, such as Henrik Ibsen, Bjørnstjerne Bjørnson and Knut Hamsun, did not adhere and continued using Dano-Norwegian. Riksmål got an official writing norm in 1907, and in 1917 a new reform introduced some elements from Norwegian dialects and Nynorsk as optional alternatives to traditional Dano-Norwegian forms. This was part of an official policy to bring the two Norwegian languages more closely together, intending eventually to merge them into one. These changes met resistance from the Riksmål movement, and Riksmålsvernet (The Society for the Protection of Riksmål) was founded in 1919. They have later been the purist protectors of the traditional riksmål, in opposition to Bokmål and Nynorsk, and especially Samnorsk.

In the 1938 reform of Bokmål introduced more elements from dialects and Nynorsk, and more importantly, many traditional Dano-Norwegian forms were excluded. This so-called radical Bokmål or Samnorsk (Common Norwegian) met even stiffer resistance from the Riksmål movement, culminating in the 1950s under the leadership of Arnulf Øverland. Riksmålsforbundet organised a parents' campaign against Samnorsk in 1951, and the Norwegian Academy for Language and Literature was founded in 1953. Because of this resistance, the 1959 reform was relatively modest, and the radical reforms were partially reverted in 1981 and 2005.

== Current status ==
Currently, Riksmål denotes the moderate, chiefly pre-1938, unofficial variant of Bokmål, which is still in use and is regulated by the Norwegian Academy and promoted by Riksmålsforbundet. Riksmål has gone through some spelling reforms, but none as profound as the ones that shaped Bokmål. A Riksmål dictionary was published in four volumes in the period 1937 to 1957 by Riksmålsvernet, and two supplementary volumes were published in 1995 by the Norwegian Academy. After the latest Bokmål reforms in 2005, the difference between Bokmål and Riksmål have diminished and they are now comparable to American and British English differences, but the Norwegian Academy still upholds its own standard.

The daily newspaper Aftenposten is notable for its historical use of Riksmål. As of 2006, the newspaper developed a standard the newspaper referred to as "moderate Bokmål," removing itself from the name Riksmål; however, linguist Helene Uri has denoted this "moderate Bokmål" as "in all practical respects the same as modern Riksmål."
