= Rune Ottosen =

Norwegian professor (born 1950)

Rune Ottosen (born 7 December 1950) is a Norwegian professor.

He graduated in journalism in 1973 at the Norwegian College of Journalism and in political science in 1984 at the University of Oslo. He teaches journalism at Oslo University College. He has published many articles and books within the field of press history, the role of the journalists and media coverage of war and conflicts.

With professor Stig Arne Nohrstedt, Ottosen has published several books on media and war coverage. In 2005, they published Global War – Local Views. Media Images of the Iraq War. In 2014 they published "New Wars, New Media and New War Journalism".

He was editor-in-chief of the Workers' Communist Party periodical Røde Fane from 1979 to 1980.

Ottosen is a son of the resistance member Kristian Ottosen.
