= Samnorsk =

Proposed Norwegian written standard language

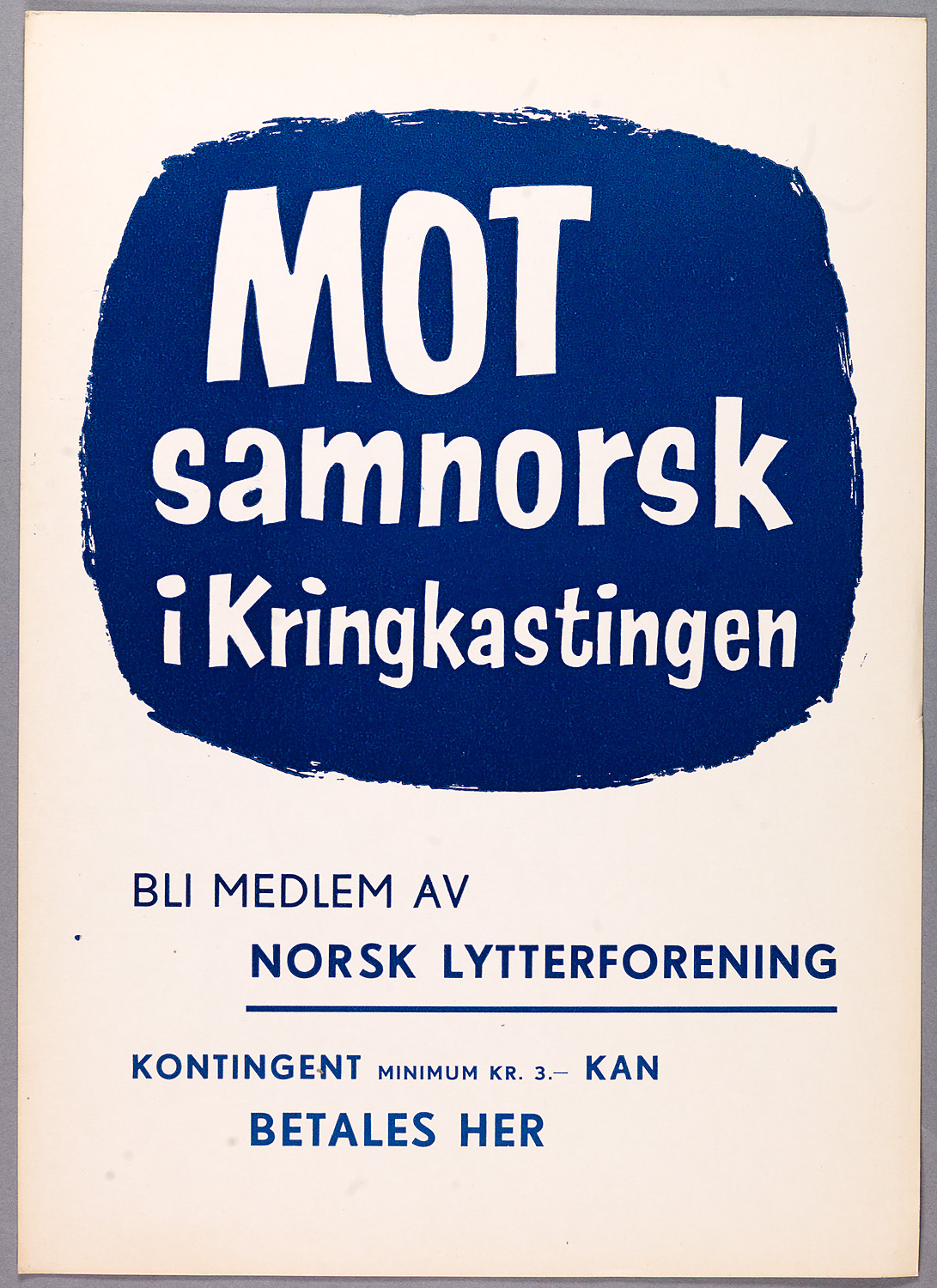
The following text in the image translates to "against samnorsk in broadcasting", showing the critique from the supporters of riksmål

Samnorsk is a written standard of the Norwegian language that was proposed between the 1930s and the 1950s as a way to bridge the gap between the existing varieties. In the 20th century, Norway had two different standards: Riksmål (a variety of modern-day Bokmål) and Landsmål (a variety of modern-day Nynorsk). A spelling reform in 1917 was conducted under the direction of king Haakon VII. This was the first attempt to combine both Bokmål and Nynorsk at that time.

In 1951, the Norwegian Parliament decided to create a language council that was supposed to work with getting Bokmål and Nynorsk closer to each other. But the debate became heated and controversial, mainly because words in Riksmål were supposed to become more "Norwegianized", angering a lot of those who supported the more "Danicized" Riksmål spelling standard. What was optional in the 1917 reform became mandatory in the 1938 reform. Among the variations was the use of -a in definite articles of feminine words (such as melket becoming mjølka).

== See also ==
- Norwegian language conflict
- Bokmål
- Nynorsk
