= Christopher Hals Gylseth =

Norwegian author (born 1965)

Christopher Hals Gylseth (born 5 July 1965) is a Norwegian author. He studied history of ideas and has written many biographies of Norwegian people, amongst them Ola Thommessen, Elling M. Solheim and Øvre Richter Frich.
