= Bokmål =

One of the Norwegian language standards

Norwegian Bokmål
- bokmål
- Pronunciation: Urban East Norwegian: [ˈbûːkmoːɫ]
- Native to: Norway
- Native speakers: None (written only)
- Language family: Indo-European: Germanic; North Germanic; East Scandinavian; Danish and Norwegian; Dano-Norwegian; Norwegian Bokmål
- Early forms: Old Norse: Old East Norse; Early Old Danish; Late Old Danish; Dano-Norwegian; Riksmål
- Standard forms: Bokmål (official); Riksmål (unofficial)
- Writing system: Latin (Norwegian alphabet)

Official status
- Official language in: Norway; Nordic Council
- Regulated by: Norwegian Language Council (Bokmål); Norwegian Academy (Riksmål)

Language codes
- ISO 639-1: nb
- ISO 639-2: nob
- ISO 639-3: nob
- Glottolog: norw1259
- Linguasphere: 52-AAA-ba

Bokmål (Urban East Norwegian: [ˈbûːkmoːɫ]; UK: /ˈbuːk.mɔːl/, US: /ˈbʊk.-, ˈboʊk.-/; lit. 'book-tongue') is one of the official written standards for the Norwegian language, alongside Nynorsk. Bokmål is by far the most used written form of Norwegian today, as it is adopted by around 90% of the population in Norway. There is no countrywide standard or agreement on the pronunciation of Bokmål and the spoken dialects vary greatly.

Bokmål is regulated by the governmental Language Council of Norway. A related, more conservative orthographic standard, commonly known as Riksmål, is regulated by the non-governmental Norwegian Academy for Language and Literature. The written standard is a Norwegianised variety of the Danish language.

The first Bokmål orthography was officially adopted in 1907 under the name Riksmål after being under development since 1879. The architects behind the reform were Marius Nygaard and Jacob Jonathan Aars. It was an adaptation of written Danish—commonly used since the past union with Denmark—to Dano-Norwegian, the koiné spoken by the Norwegian urban elite, especially in the capital. When the large conservative newspaper Aftenposten adopted the 1907 orthography in 1923, Danish writing was practically out of use in Norway. The name Bokmål was officially adopted in 1929 after a proposition to call the written language Dano-Norwegian lost by a single vote in the Lagting.

The government does not regulate spoken Bokmål and recommends that normalised pronunciation should follow the phonology of the speaker's local dialect. In Eastern Norway, Urban East Norwegian (Standard East Norwegian) is generally accepted as the de facto spoken standard of Bokmål/Riksmål.

All spoken variations of the Norwegian language are used in the Storting (parliament) and in Norwegian national broadcasters such as NRK and TV 2, even in cases where the conventions of Bokmål are used. The spoken variation typically reflects a speaker's native region.

== History ==
Up until about 1300, the written language of Norway, Old Norwegian, was essentially the same as the other Old Norse dialects. The speech, however, was gradually differentiated into local and regional dialects. As long as Norway remained an independent kingdom, the written language remained essentially constant.

In 1380, Norway entered into a personal union with Denmark. By the early 16th century, Norway had lost its separate political institutions, and together with Denmark formed the political unit known as Denmark–Norway until 1814, progressively becoming the weaker member of the union. During this period, the modern Danish and Norwegian languages emerged. Norwegian went through a Middle Norwegian transition, and a Danish written language more heavily influenced by Low German was gradually standardised. This process was aided by the Reformation, which prompted Christiern Pedersen's translation of the Bible into Danish. Remnants of written Old Norse and Norwegian were thus displaced by the Danish standard, which became used for virtually all administrative documents.

Norwegians used Danish primarily in writing, but it gradually came to be spoken by urban elites on formal or official occasions. Although Danish never became the spoken language of the vast majority of the population, by the time Norway's ties with Denmark were severed in 1814, a Dano-Norwegian vernacular often called the "educated daily speech" had become the mother tongue of elites in most Norwegian cities, such as Bergen, Kristiania and Trondheim. This Dano-Norwegian koiné could be described as Danish with regional Norwegian pronunciation (see Norwegian dialects), some Norwegian vocabulary, and simplified grammar.

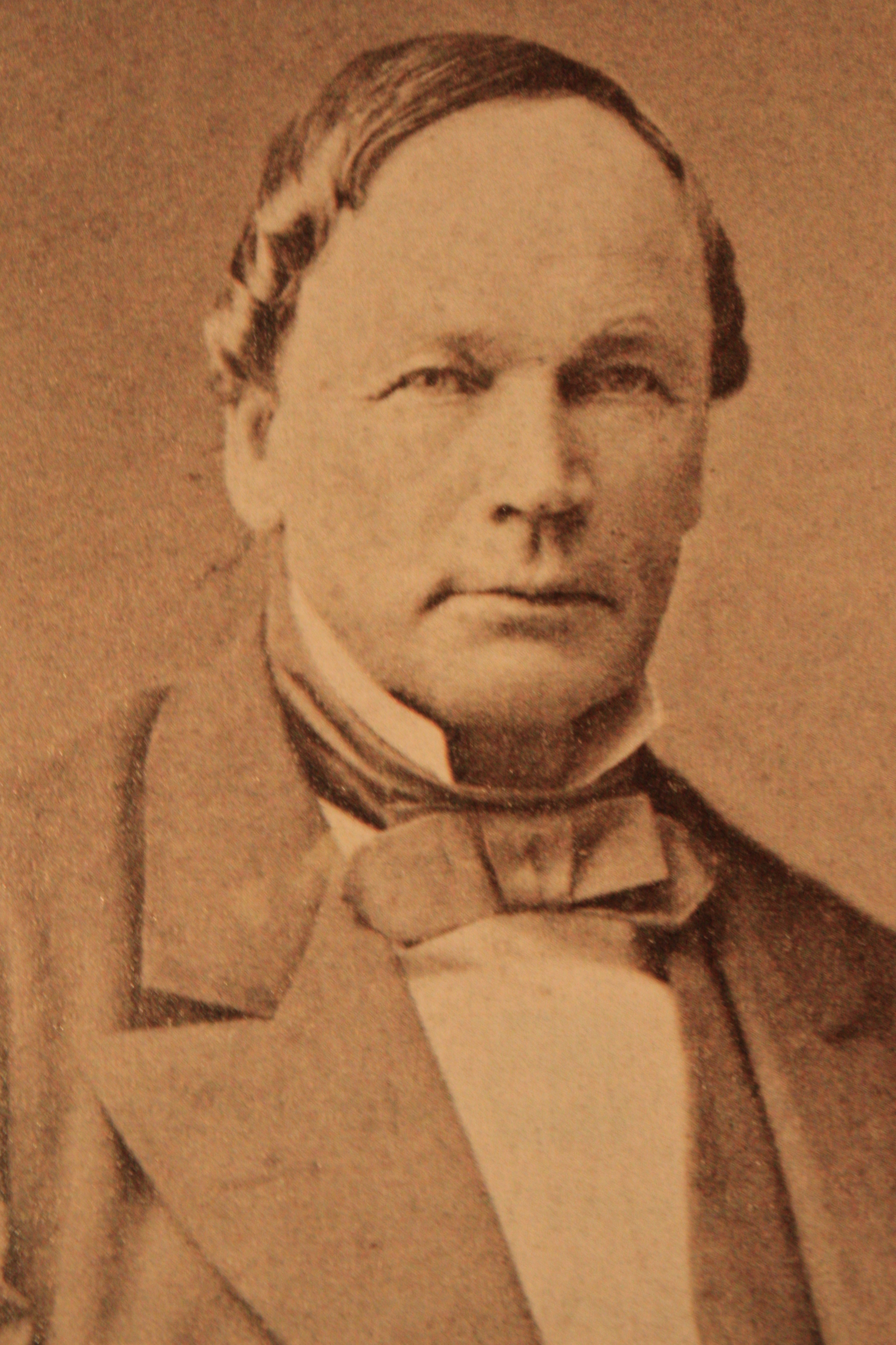
Knud Knudsen, often called the "father of Bokmål"

With the gradual subsequent process of Norwegianisation of the written language used in the cities of Norway, from Danish to Bokmål and Riksmål, the upper-class sociolects in the cities changed accordingly. In 1814, when Norway was ceded from Denmark to Sweden, Norway defied Sweden and its allies, declared independence and adopted a democratic constitution. Although compelled to submit to a dynastic union with Sweden, this spark of independence continued to burn, influencing the evolution of language in Norway. Old language traditions were revived by the patriotic poet Henrik Wergeland (1808–1845), who championed an independent non-Danish written language. Haugen indicates that:

Within the first generation of liberty, two solutions emerged and won adherents, one based on the speech of the upper class and one on that of the common people. The former called for Norwegianisation of the Danish writing, the latter for a brand new start.

The more conservative of the two language transitions was advanced by the work of writers like Peter Asbjørnsen and Jørgen Moe, schoolmaster and agitator for language reform Knud Knudsen, and Knudsen's famous disciple, Bjørnstjerne Bjørnson, as well as a more cautious Norwegianisation by Henrik Ibsen. In particular, Knudsen's work on language reform in the mid-19th century was important for the 1907 orthography and a subsequent reform in 1917, so much so that he is now often called the "father of Bokmål".

== Controversy ==
=== Riksmål and Bokmål ===
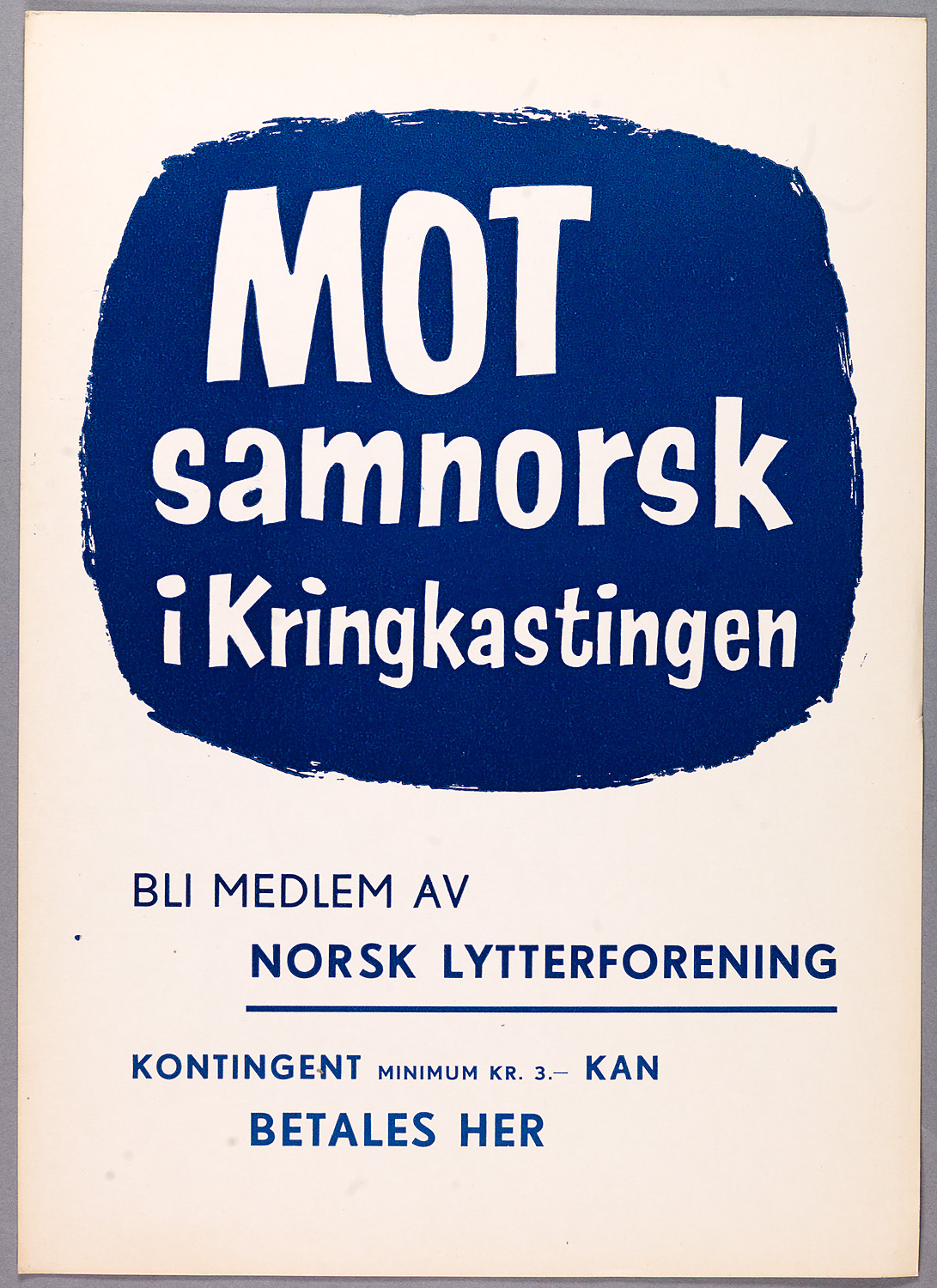
Poster from a campaign against mandatory Samnorsk, c. 1955

Since the creation of Landsmål, the Danish written in Norway was referred to as (det almindelige) Bogmaal, etc. ("(The ordinary) book language"), e.g. in Den norske Literatur fra 1814 indtil vore Dage (Hans Olaf Hansen, 1862), or the synonym Bogsprog, e.g. in the 1885 decision that adopted Landsmål as a co-official language.

The term Riksmål (Rigsmaal), meaning National Language, was first proposed by Bjørnstjerne Bjørnson in 1899 as a name for the Norwegian variety of written Danish as well as spoken Dano-Norwegian. It was borrowed from Denmark where it denoted standard written and spoken Danish. The same year the Riksmål movement became organised under his leadership in order to fight against the growing influence of Nynorsk, eventually leading to the foundation of the non-governmental organisation Riksmålsforbundet in 1907, which he led until his death in 1910.

The 1907 reform documents do not mention the language by name, but the term Riksmål eventually caught on and was adopted by the Ministry of Church and Education in the years leading up to the 1917 spelling reform, appearing in its 1908 publication Utredning av spørsmaalet om et mulig samarbeide mellem landsmaal og riksmaal i retskrivningen ("Investigation of the question of a possible cooperation between Landmål and Riksmål with regards to orthography"). Through this work an official policy to merge the standards (to a common Samnorsk) through spelling reforms came to be.

In line with these plans, the 1917 reform introduced some elements from Norwegian dialects and Nynorsk as optional alternatives to traditional Dano-Norwegian forms. The reform met some resistance from the Riksmål movement, and Riksmålsvernet (The Society for the Protection of Riksmål) was founded in 1919.

In 1929, the parliament voted to rename the written standards. Bokmål was re-introduced as the official name for the Dano-Norwegian standard, replacing Riksmål, while Landsmål was renamed Nynorsk.

In 1938 both written standards were heavily reformed and many common spellings and grammatical endings were made mandatory. This meant the removal of many traditional Dano-Norwegian forms in Bokmål, a decision that was harshly criticised by the Riksmål movement for being too radical and premature. While it criticised the adoption of Nynorsk spellings, it initially also expressed support for making the orthography more phonemic, for instance by removing silent h's in interrogative pronouns (which was done in Swedish a few years earlier).

The resistance culminated in the 1950s under the leadership of Arnulf Øverland. Riksmålsforbundet organised a parents' campaign against Samnorsk in 1951, and the Norwegian Academy for Language and Literature was founded in 1953. Because of this resistance, the 1959 reform was relatively modest, and some of the common traditional Danish spellings and inflections were admitted back into the standard through the reforms in 1981 and 2005.

Currently, Riksmål denotes a language form regulated by the non-governmental organisation The Norwegian Academy of Language and Literature. It is based on pre-1938 Bokmål and has been regulated by The Academy as a private alternative to the official Bokmål spelling standard since the 1950s. Over time it has accepted widespread "radical" spellings into the Riksmål standard. Since the official Samnorsk policy was abolished, Riksmål and Bokmål have converged, and The Academy currently edits an online dictionary that covers both. The differences have diminished (now being comparable to American and British English differences), but The Academy still upholds its own standard.

Norway's most popular daily newspaper, Aftenposten, is notable for its use of Riksmål as its standard language. Use of Riksmål is rigorously pursued, even with regard to readers' letters, which are "translated" into the standard. Aftenposten gave up its most markedly conservative "signal words" in 1990.

While the specifics of the debate are unique to Norway, some parallels can be found in Austrian German and the One Standard German Axiom, which revolves over the kind of standard to be used in a non-dominant country.

=== Språkloven ===
Språkloven is a Norwegian law that was passed by the Storting in 2021. The law promotes equality between Bokmål and Nynorsk. The law also contains provisions on the protection and status of several minority languages: Kven, Romani, Romanes, Sami languages and Norwegian sign language. Before the law was passed Riksmålsforbundet criticised the law for favoring Nynorsk over Bokmål: "Riksmålsforbundet is against the quota rules and believes that it does not reflect the actual use of the written standards, but leads to a large imbalance in distribution. The 25 percent rate is disproportionately high and must not be legislated. In practice, the 25 percent is a Nynorsk percentage, and it is not reasonable when the actual number of Nynorsk users in the population is less than half of this proportion." Peder Lofsnes Hauge, the leader of Noregs mållag, argues that: "As a less used language, Nynorsk needs its own strengthening, which Bokmål does not. Språkloven gives the state this responsibility. We must rather favor Nynorsk until it is as easy to be a Nynorsk user as it is to be a Bokmål user."

Some people who use Bokmål think Nynorsk is unnecessary and that it is kept alive by the state.

=== Terminology ===
Map of the official language forms of Norwegian municipalities. Red is Bokmål, blue is Nynorsk and gray denotes neutral areas.

In the Norwegian discourse, the term Dano-Norwegian is seldom used with reference to contemporary Bokmål and its spoken varieties. The nationality of the language has been a hotly debated topic, and its users and proponents have generally not been fond of the implied association with Danish (hence the neutral names Riksmål and Bokmål, meaning state language and book language respectively). The debate intensified with the advent of Nynorsk in the 19th century, a written language based on rural Modern Norwegian dialects and puristic opposition to the Danish and Dano-Norwegian spoken in Norwegian cities.

== Characteristics ==
=== Differences from Danish ===
The following table shows a few central differences between Bokmål and Danish.

Differences between Bokmål and Danish
	Danish	Bokmål
Definite plural suffix either -ene or -erne the women the wagons	kvinderne vognene	kvinnene vognene
West Scandinavian diphthongs heath hay	hede hø	hei høy
Softening of p, t and k loss (noun) food (noun) roof (noun)	tab mad tag	tap mat tak
Danish vocabulary afraid (adjective) angry (adjective) boy (noun) frog (noun)	bange (also ræd) vred dreng (also gut) frø	redd sint or vred gutt frosk

=== Differences from the traditional Oslo dialect ===
Most natives of Oslo today speak a dialect that is an amalgamation of vikværsk (which is the technical term for the traditional dialects in the Oslofjord area) and written Danish; and subsequently Riksmål and Bokmål, which primarily inherited their non-Oslo elements from Danish. The present-day Oslo dialect is also influenced by other Eastern Norwegian dialects.

The following table shows some important cases where traditional Bokmål and Standard Østnorsk followed Danish rather than the traditional Oslo dialect as it is commonly portrayed in literature about Norwegian dialects. In many of these cases, radical Bokmål follows the traditional Oslo dialect and Nynorsk, and these forms are also given.

Differences between Bokmål and the traditional Oslo dialect
	Danish	Bokmål/Standard Østnorsk		traditional Oslo dialect	Nynorsk (Note: Closest match to the traditional Oslo dialect.)
	Danish	traditional	radical	traditional Oslo dialect	Nynorsk
Differentiation between masculine and feminine a small man a small woman	en lille mand en lille kvinde	en liten mann en liten kvinne	en liten mann ei lita kvinne		
Differentiation between masc. and fem. definite plural the boats the wagons	bådene vognene	båtene vognene		båtane vognene	
Definite plural neuter suffix the houses	-ene/erne husene	-ene husene	-a husa		
Weak past participle suffix cycled	-et cyklet	-et syklet	-a sykla		
Weak preterite suffix cycled	-ede cyklede	-et syklet	-a sykla		
Strong past participle suffix written	-et skrevet			-i skrivi	-e (Note: Nynorsk had both -i and -e up until 2012) skrive
Split infinitive come lie (in bed)	komme ligge			komma ligge	
Splitting of masculines ending on unstressed vowel ladder round	stige runde			yes stega runde	stige runde
West Scandinavian diphthongs leg (noun) smoke (noun) soft/wet (adjective)	ben røg blød	ben røk bløt	bein røyk blaut		
West Scandinavian u for o bridge (noun)	bro (Note: However, Bokmål uses ku "cow" and (now archaic) su "sow" exclusively.)		bru		
West Scandinavian a-umlaut floor (noun)	gulv		golv	gølv	golv
Stress on first syllable in loan words banana (noun)	/baˈnaˀːn/	no officially recognised standard pronunciation		/ˈbɑnɑn/	no officially recognised standard pronunciation
Retroflex flap /ɽ/ from old Norse /rð/ table, board (noun)	no /boˀːr/	no officially recognised standard pronunciation		/buːɽ/	no officially recognised standard pronunciation
Retroflex flap /ɽ/ from old Norse /l/ sun (noun)	/soˀːl/	no officially recognised standard pronunciation		/suːɽ/	no officially recognised standard pronunciation

== See also ==
- History of Norway
- Høgnorsk – Unofficial Norwegian written standard language
- Nynorsk
- Samnorsk
