= Johan E. Holand =

Norwegian journalist and politician

Johan Edvard Holand (22 October 1919 – 21 December 2009) was a Norwegian journalist and politician.

He was born in Stavanger to the print shop owner Johan Wesley Holand and his wife Johanne Marie Pedersen. He enrolled as a student in 1939, and studied German, Norwegian and history. He worked as a journalist at Stavangeren from 1945 to 1948, and at Morgenbladet from 1948 to 1950.

Holand was a member of the national board of the Norwegian Young Conservatives from 1949 to 1951. He chaired Larvik Conservative Party from 1953 to 1955 and Skien Conservative Party from 1963 to 1966. Between 1958 and 1962, Holand was a member of the national board of the Norwegian Press Association. He was also a board member of the Conservative Press Association, and its chairman until he was succeeded by Johan A. Iversen.
