= Old East Norse =

Dialect of Old Norse

- Øst Norrönt / Östr Norrœnt (East Norse), Øst-Skandinavisk (East Scandinavian)
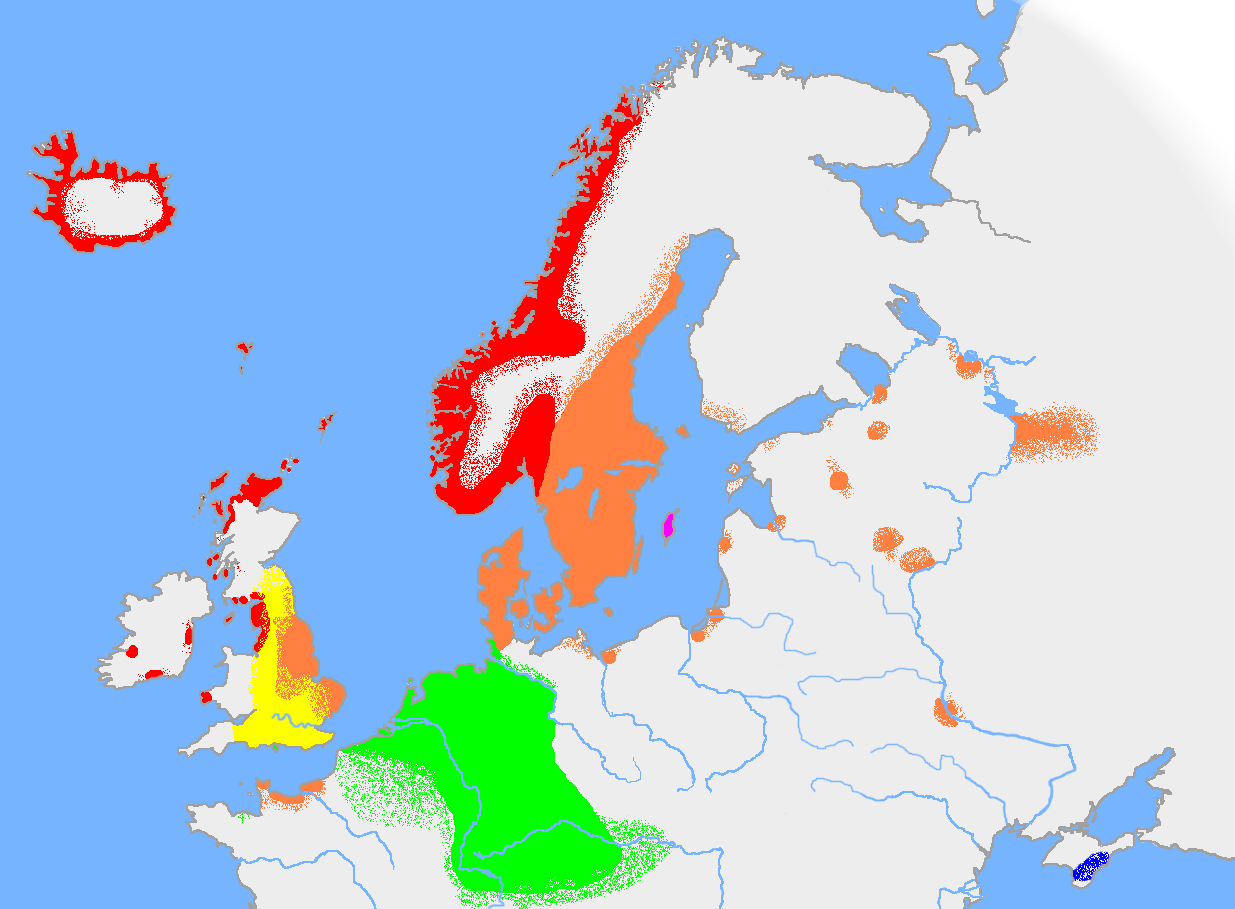
- Old East Norse
- Region: Denmark, Sweden, England, Normandy, the Volga and places in-between
- Era: 9th–12th century
- Language family: Indo-European: Germanic; North Germanic; East Scandinavian; Old East Norse
- Early forms: Proto-Indo-European: Proto-Germanic; Proto-Norse; Old Norse
- Writing system: Runic, later Latin

Language codes
- ISO 639-3: (covered by Old Norse non)
- Glottolog: olde1240

Old East Norse was a dialect of Old Norse which evolved into the languages of Old Danish and Old Swedish from the 9th century to the 12th century. Such is indigenously separated into "Runic Danish" (runedansk/rundanska) and "Runic Swedish" (runesvensk/runsvenska) as it is only recorded in Runic.

== Language history ==
Old East Norse between 800 and 1100 is called in Sweden Runic Swedish and in Denmark Runic Danish. They are called runic because the body of text appears in runes. The use of Swedish and Danish is not for linguistic reasons as the differences between them are minute. Changes had a tendency to occur earlier in the Danish region.

Runic Old East Norse is characteristically archaic in form. In essence it matches or surpasses the archaicness of post-runic Old West Norse which in its turn is generally more archaic than post-runic Old East Norse. While typically "Eastern" in structure, many later post-runic changes and trademarks of EON had yet to happen.

Unlike Proto-Norse, which was written with the Elder Futhark alphabet, Old Norse was written with the Younger Futhark alphabet, which only had 16 letters. Due to the limited number of runes, some runes were used for a range of phonemes, such as the rune for the vowel u which was also used for the vowels o, ø and y, and the rune for i which was also used for e.

The first distinction between the Eastern and Western dialects can be traced to around the 7th century, when the combinations -mp-, -nt-, and -nk- mostly merged to -pp-, -tt- and -kk- in Old West Norse. The following table illustrates this (note the mutual influence of East and West Norse on each other):

English	Norwegian Nynorsk	Faroese	Icelandic	Old West Norse	Proto-Norse	Old East Norse	Swedish	Danish	Norwegian Bokmål
mushroom	sopp	soppur	sveppur	s(v)ǫppr	*swampu	swampr	svamp	svamp	sopp
steep	bratt	brattur	brattur	brattr	*brantaz	brantr	brant	brat	bratt
widow	enkje	einkja, arch. ekkja	ekkja	ekkja	*ain(a)kjōn	ænkja	änka	enke	enke
to shrink	kreppe	kreppa	kreppa	kreppa	*krimpan	krimpa	krympa	krympe	krympe
to sprint	sprette	spretta	spretta	spretta	*sprintan	sprinta	spritta, dial. sprinta	sprinte	sprette
to sink	søkke	søkka	sökkva	søkkva	*sankwian	sænkva	sjunka	synke	synke

An early difference between Old West Norse and the other dialects was that Old West Norse had the forms bú "dwelling", kú "cow" (accusative) and trú "faith" whereas Old East Norse had bó, kó and tró. Old West Norse was also characterized by the preservation of u-umlaut, which meant that for example Proto-Norse *tanþu "tooth" was pronounced tǫnn and not tann as in post-runic Old East Norse; OWN gǫ́s and runic OEN gǫ́s, while post-runic OEN gás "goose".

The phoneme ʀ, which evolved during the Proto-Norse period from z, was still clearly separated from r in most positions, even when being geminated, while in OWN it had already merged with r.

Another change was of the diphthong æi (Old West Norse ei) to the monophthong e, as in stæin to sten. This is reflected in runic inscriptions where the older read stain and the later stin. Monophthongization of æi > ē and øy, au > ø̄ started in mid-10th-century Denmark. Compare runic OEN: fæigʀ, gæiʀʀ, haugʀ, møydōmʀ, diūʀ; with Post-runic OEN: fēgher, gēr, hø̄gher, mø̄dōmber, diūr; OWN: feigr, geirr, haugr, meydómr, dýr; from PN *faigiaz, *gaizaz, *haugaz, *mawi- + dōmaz (maidendom; virginity), *diuza ((wild) animal).

There was also a change of au as in dauðr into ø as in døðr. This change is shown in runic inscriptions as a change from tauþr into tuþr. Moreover, the øy (Old West Norse ey) diphthong changed into ø as well, as in the Old Norse word for "island".

Feminine o-stems often preserve the plural ending -aʀ while in OWN they more often merge with the feminine i-stems: (runic OEN) *sōlaʀ, *hafnaʀ/*hamnaʀ, *wāgaʀ while OWN sólir, hafnir and vágir (modern Swedish solar, hamnar, vågar; suns, havens, scales; Danish has mainly lost the distinction between the two stems with both endings now being rendered as -er or -e alternatively for the o-stems).

Vice versa, masculine i-stems with the root ending in either g or k tended to shift the plural ending to that of the ja-stems while OWN kept the original: drængiaʀ, *ælgiaʀ and *bænkiaʀ while OWN drengir, elgir (elks) and bekkir (modern Swedish drängar, älgar, bänkar).

The plural ending of ja-stems were mostly preserved while those of OWN often acquired that of the i-stems: *bæðiaʀ, *bækkiaʀ, *wæfiaʀ while OWN beðir (beds), bekkir, vefir (modern Swedish bäddar, bäckar, vävar).

=== Old Danish ===
Until the early 12th century, Old East Norse was very much a uniform dialect. It was in Denmark that the first innovations appeared that would differentiate Old Danish from Old Swedish^{:3} as these innovations spread north unevenly (unlike the earlier changes that spread more evenly over the East Norse area) creating a series of isoglosses going from Zealand to Svealand.

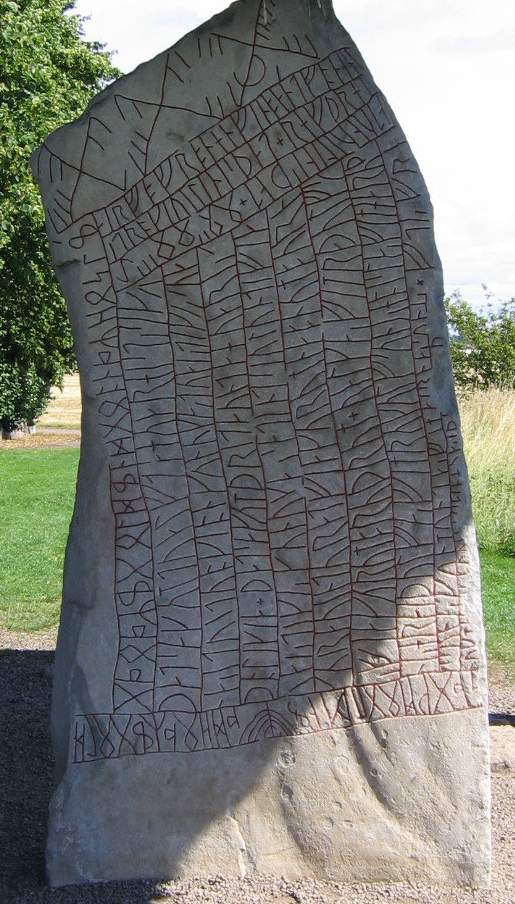
The Rök runestone in Östergötland, Sweden, is the longest surviving source of early Old East Norse. It is inscribed on both sides.

In Old Danish, /hɾ/ merged with /ɾ/ during the 9th century. From the 11th to 14th centuries, the unstressed vowels -a, -o and -e (standard normalization -a, -u and -i) started to merge into -ə, represented with the letter e. This vowel came to be epenthetic, particularly before -ʀ endings. At the same time, the voiceless stop consonants p, t and k became voiced plosives and even fricative consonants. Resulting from these innovations, Danish has kage (cake), tunger (tongues) and gæster (guests) whereas (Standard) Swedish has retained older forms, kaka, tungor and gäster (OEN kaka, tungur, gæstir).

Moreover, the Danish pitch accent shared with Norwegian and Swedish changed into stød around this time.

Old East Norse, spoken in the Danelaw in England, may have influenced the development of Early Middle English from (Anglo-Saxon) Old English.

=== Old Swedish ===
At the end of the 10th and early 11th century initial h- before l, n and r was still preserved in the middle and northern parts of Sweden, and is sporadically still preserved in some northern dialects as g-, e.g. gly (lukewarm), from hlýʀ. The Dalecarlian dialects developed as Old Swedish dialects and as such can be considered separate languages from Swedish.

=== Text example ===
This is an extract from Västgötalagen, the Westrogothic law. It is the oldest text written as a manuscript found in Sweden and from the 13th century. It is contemporaneous with most of the Icelandic literature. The text marks the beginning of Old Swedish as a distinct dialect.

Dræpær maþar svænskan man eller smalenskæn, innan konongsrikis man, eigh væstgøskan, bøte firi atta ørtogher ok þrettan markær ok ænga ætar bot. [...] Dræpar maþær danskan man allæ noræn man, bøte niv markum. Dræpær maþær vtlænskan man, eigh ma frid flyia or landi sinu oc j æth hans. Dræpær maþær vtlænskæn prest, bøte sva mykit firi sum hærlænskan man. Præstær skal i bondalaghum væræ. Varþær suþærman dræpin ællær ænskær maþær, ta skal bøta firi marchum fiurum þem sakinæ søkir, ok tvar marchar konongi.

If someone slays a Swede or a Smålander, a man from the kingdom, but not a West Geat, he will pay eight örtugar (20-pence coins) and thirteen marks, but no weregild. [...] If someone slays a Dane or a Norwegian, he will pay nine marks. If someone slays a foreigner, he shall not be banished and have to flee to his clan. If someone slays a foreign priest, he will pay as much as for a fellow countryman. A priest counts as a freeman. If a Southerner is slain or an Englishman, he shall pay four marks to the plaintiff and two marks to the king.
