= History of Danish =

The approximate extent of Old Norse and related languages in the early 10th century: Old West Norse dialect Old East Norse dialect Old Gutnish dialect Old English Crimean Gothic Other Germanic languages with which Old Norse still retained some mutual intelligibility

The Danish language developed during the Middle Ages out of Old East Norse, the common predecessor of Danish and Swedish. It was a late form of common Old Norse. The Danish philologist Johannes Brøndum-Nielsen divided the history of Danish into "Old Danish" from 800 AD to 1525 and "Modern Danish" from 1525 and onwards. He subdivided Old Danish into "Runic Danish" (800–1100), Early Middle Danish (1100–1350) and Late Middle Danish (1350–1525).

== Runic Danish ==
Old East Norse in Sweden is called Runic Swedish and in Denmark Runic Danish, but until the 12th century, the dialect was the same in the two countries. The dialects are called runic because the main body of text appears in the runic alphabet. Unlike Proto-Norse, which was written with the Elder Futhark alphabet, Old Norse was written with the Younger Futhark alphabet, which only had 16 letters. Due to the limited number of runes, some runes were used for a range of phonemes, such as the rune for the vowel u which was also used for the vowels o, ø and y, and the rune for i which was also used for e.

A change that separated Old East Norse (Runic Swedish/Danish) from Old West Norse was the change of the diphthong æi (Old West Norse ei) to the monophthong e, as in stæin to sten. This is reflected in runic inscriptions where the older read stain and the later stin. There was also a change of au as in dauðr into ø as in døðr. This change is shown in runic inscriptions as a change from tauþr into tuþr. Moreover, the øy (Old West Norse ey) diphthong changed into ø as well, as in the Old Norse word for "island".

== Middle Danish ==
Fangær man saar i hor seng mæth annæns mansz kunæ. oc kumær han burt liuænd....
"If one catches someone in the whore-bed with another man's wife and he comes away alive..."

— Jutlandic Law, 1241

takær bondæ annær man mæth sin kunæ oc kumar swa at han dræpær anti mannen....
"If a peasant takes another man with his wife and does it happen that he does not kill the man..."

— The Zealandic Law of Erik, approx. 1250

hittær man annær man i siangu mæþ aþulkunu sinni ok dræpær bondæn horkarkl i sængu mæþ hænnæ....
"If one finds another man in bed with one's wedded wife and if the peasant kills the whore-churl in bed with her..."

— Scanian Law, approx. 1216

From 1100 and onwards, the dialect of Denmark began to diverge from that of Sweden. The innovations spread unevenly from Denmark which created a series of minor dialectal boundaries, isoglosses, ranging from Zealand to Svealand. In the medieval period Danish emerged as a separate language from Swedish. The main written language was Latin, and the few Danish language texts preserved from this period are written in the Latin alphabet, although the runic alphabet seems to have lingered in popular usage in some areas. The main text types written in this period are laws, which were formulated in the vernacular language to be accessible also to those who were not Latinate. The Jutlandic Law and Scanian Law were written in vernacular Danish in the early 13th century. Beginning in 1350, Danish began to be used as a language of administration and new types of literature began to be written in the language, such as royal letters and testaments. The orthography in this period was not standardized nor was the spoken language, and the regional laws demonstrate the dialectal differences between the regions in which they were written. Throughout this period, Danish was in contact with Low German, and many Low German loan words were introduced.

Starting in the 12th century, voiceless stops become voiced when between vowels or at the end of a word, and in the 13th century these become fricatives.

Examples of lenition in Danish
Danish	Swedish	Danish	Swedish
gabe	gapa	skib	skepp
gade	gata	fod	fot
lege	leka	bog	bok

When following a short syllable and preceded by /j/, consonants (except fricatives) were lengthened. This must have happened before lenition since voiceless stops stay as such (e.g. setja → sætte). This is a very similar process to the West Germanic gemination in neighboring languages.

Examples of gemination by /j/ in Danish
Danish	Old Norse	Danish	Old Norse
sætte	setja	skønne	skynja

Starting in the 13th century, vowels are lengthened before certain consonant clusters, most commonly before rd but sometimes also nd, ld. This lengthening was often later reverted in modern Danish, but not before long a rounded to å (or o, as in holde).

Examples of lengthening before consonant clusters in Danish
Danish	Old Norse	Danish	Old Norse
skår	skarð	holde	halda

== Renaissance and Reformation ==
With the Protestant Reformation in 1536, Danish also became the language of religion, which sparked a new interest in using Danish as a literary language. It is also in this period that Danish begins to take on the linguistic traits that differentiate it from Swedish and Norwegian, such as the stød and the voicing of many stop consonants.

The first printed book in Danish dates from 1495, "Rimkrøniken" (the Rhyming Chronicle), a history book told in rhymed verses. The first complete translation of the Bible in Danish, the Bible of Christian III, some parts translated by Christiern Pedersen, was published in 1550. Pedersen's orthographic choices set the de facto standard for subsequent writing in Danish.

== Modern Danish ==
The first translation of the Bible in Danish was published in 1550.

Some notable authors of works in Danish are existential philosopher Søren Kierkegaard, prolific fairy tale author Hans Christian Andersen, and playwrights Henrik Ibsen and Ludvig Holberg. Three 20th-century Danish authors have become Nobel Prize laureates in Literature: Karl Adolph Gjellerup and Henrik Pontoppidan (joint recipients in 1917) and Johannes Vilhelm Jensen (awarded 1944).

== Bibliography ==
- Ejskjær, I. (1990). "Stød and pitch accents in the Danish dialects". Acta Linguistica Hafniensia. 22 (1): 49–75. doi:10.1080/03740463.1990.10411522.
- Gregersen, Frans; Holmen, Anne; Kristiansen, Tore; Møller, Erik; Pedersen, Inge Lise; Steensig, Jakob; Ulbæk, lb, eds. (1996). Dansk Sproglære. Dansklærerforeningen.
- Faarlund, Jan Terje (1994). "3. Old and Middle Scandinavian". In König, Ekkehard; van der Auwera, Johan (eds.). The Germanic Languages. Routledge Language Family Descriptions. Routledge. pp. 39–71. ISBN 978-0-415-28079-2.
- Haberland, Hartmut (1994). "10. Danish". In König, Ekkehard; van der Auwera, Johan (eds.). The Germanic Languages. Routledge Language Family Descriptions. Routledge. pp. 313–349. ISBN 978-0-415-28079-2.
- Thomas F. Shannon (July 1999). "Reviewed Work: The Germanic Languages". Journal of Linguistics. 35 (2): 430–436. JSTOR 4176538.
- Jespersen, Otto (1906). Modersmålets fonetik. Schuboth.
- Jørgensen, Bent (2016). "Sproghistoriske perioder". In Jacobsen, Henrik Galberg; Jørgensen, Bent; Jacobsen, Birgitte; Fahl, Laurids Kristian (eds.). Dansk Sproghistorie (vol. 1): Dansk tager form. Aarhus: Aarhus University Press. pp. 79–83. ISBN 9788771841626.
- Kroman, E (1980). "Debat: Stød-og accentområder og deres oprindelse". Fortid og Nutid, 1.
- Torp, Arne (2006). "Nordiske sprog i fortid og nutid. Sproglighed og sprogforskelle, sprogfamilier og sprogslægtskab" (PDF). Nordens Sprog med rødder og fødder. Nordens Sprogråd.
- Pedersen, Inge Lise (1996). "Sprogsamfundets Historie". In Gregersen, Frans; Holmen, Anne; Kristiansen, Tore; Møller, Erik; Pedersen, Inge Lise; Steensig, Jakob; Ulbæk, lb (eds.). Dansk Sproglære. Dansklærerforeningen.
- Sørensen, V. (2011). Lyd og prosodi i de klassiske danske dialekter (PDF). Peter Skautrup Centret. Archived from the original (PDF) on 18 May 2015.
- "Language" (PDF). Royal Danish ministry of foreign affairs. Archived from the original (PDF) on 13 October 2006.
