= Norsk biografisk leksikon =

Norwegian biographical encyclopedia

- Native name: Norsk biografisk leksikon (NBL) (Norwegian Biographical Encyclopedia)
- Website type: Biographical Dictionary
- Available in: Bokmål, Nynorsk
- Area served: Worldwide
- Owner: Great Norwegian Encyclopedia Association
- Editor: Erik Bolstad
- Parent: Great Norwegian Encyclopedia
- Website: meta.snl.no/Om_Norsk_biografisk_leksikon
- Commercial: No
- Launched: 2009; 17 years ago
- Current status: Active
- ISSN: 2464-1502

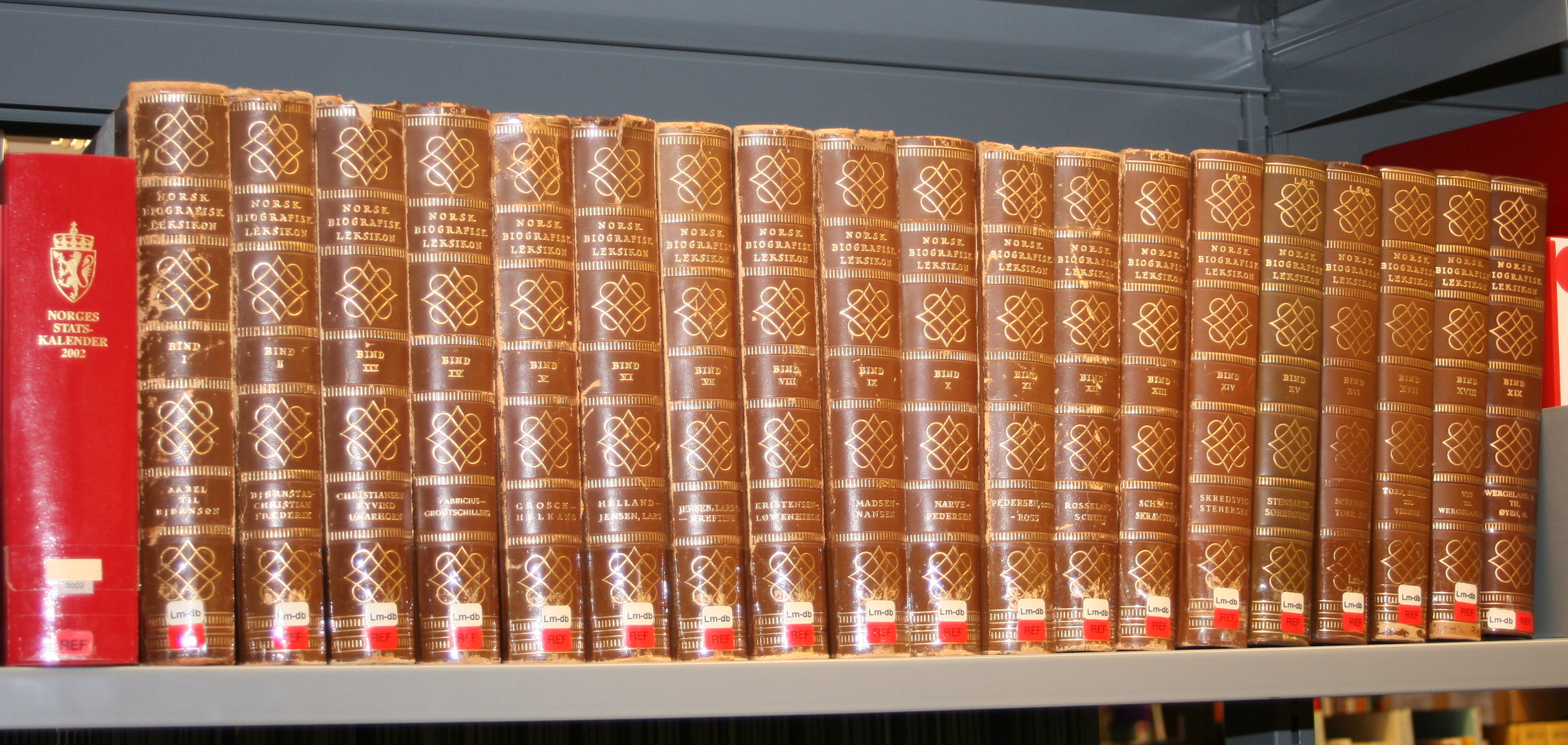
19 volumes

Norsk biografisk leksikon is the largest Norwegian biographical encyclopedia. It is part of the Store norske leksikon ("Great Norwegian Encyclopedia").

== Origin ==
The first print edition (NBL1) was issued between 1923 and 1983; it included 19 volumes and 5,100 articles.

Kunnskapsforlaget took over the rights to NBL1 from Aschehoug in 1995, and work began on a second print edition (NBL2) in 1998. The project had economic support from the Fritt Ord Foundation and the Ministry of Culture, and NBL2 was launched in the years 1999–2005, including 10 volumes and around 5,700 articles.

== Online access ==
In 2009 an Internet edition, with free access, was released by Kunnskapsforlaget together with the general-purpose Store norske leksikon. The electronic edition features additional biographies, and updates about dates of death of biographies. Apart from that, the vast body of text is unaltered from the printed version.

== List of volumes ==
This is a list of volumes in the second edition of Norsk biografisk leksikon.

- Volume 1: Abel–Bruusgaard. Published 1999
- Volume 2: Bry–Ernø. Published 2000
- Volume 3: Escholt–Halvdan. Published 2001
- Volume 4: Halvorsen–Ibsen. Published 2001
- Volume 5: Ihlen–Larsson. Published 2002
- Volume 6: Lassen–Nitter. Published 2003
- Volume 7: Njøs–Samuelsen. Published 2003
- Volume 8: Sand–Sundquist. Published 2004
- Volume 9: Sundt–Wikborg. Published 2005
- Volume 10: Wilberg–Aavik, plus extra material. Published 2005

This is a list of volumes in the first edition of Norsk biografisk leksikon.

- Volume 1: Aabel–Bjørnson. Published 1923
- Volume 2: Bjørnstad–Christian Frederik. Published 1925
- Volume 3: Christiansen–Eyvind Urarhorn. Published 1926
- Volume 4: Fabricius–Grodtschilling. Published 1929
- Volume 5: Grosch–Helkand. Published 1931
- Volume 6: Helland–Lars Jensen. Published 1934
- Volume 7: Lars O. Jensen–Krefting. Published 1936
- Volume 8: Kristensen–Løwenhielm. Published 1938
- Volume 9: Madsen–Nansen. Published 1940
- Volume 10: Narve–Harald C. Pedersen. Published 1949
- Volume 11: Oscar Pedersen–Ross. Published 1952
- Volume 12: Rosseland–Schult. Published 1954
- Volume 13: Schultz–Skramstad. Published 1958
- Volume 14: Skredsvig–Stenersen. Published 1962
- Volume 15: Stensaker–Sørbrøden. Published 1966
- Volume 16: Sørensen–Alf Torp. Published 1969
- Volume 17: Eivind Torp–Vidnes. Published 1975
- Volume 18: Vig–Henrik Wergeland. Published 1977
- Volume 19: N. Wergeland–Øyen. Published 1983
