= Languages of Norway =

- Official: Norwegian (Note: Written in Bokmål and Nynorsk); Sámi (Note: Lule, Southern and Northern)
- Minority: Kven Finnish; Romani; Romanes
- Foreign: English (>90%)
- Signed: Norwegian Sign Language
- Keyboard layout: Norwegian QWERTY

Many languages are spoken, written and signed in Norway.

In Norway, the indigenous languages, Norwegian and Sámi, have official status. Out of them, Norwegian is the most widely spoken language in Norway. English, a foreign language, is the second most widely spoken language in Norway. As of 2013, there are 4.5 million fluent English-speakers (approximately 88% of the Norwegian population).

== Norwegian ==
The most widely spoken language in Norway is Norwegian. It is a North Germanic language, closely related to Swedish and Danish, all linguistic descendants of Old Norse. Norwegian is used by some 95% of the population as a first language. The language has two separate written standards: Nynorsk ("New Norwegian", "New" in the sense of contemporary or modern as opposed to old Norse) and Bokmål ("Book Language/Tongue/Speech"), both of which are official.

=== Norwegian language struggle ===
The European portions of the Kingdom of Denmark-Norway until 1814.

Known as Språkstriden in Norwegian, the Norwegian language struggle is a movement rooted in both Norwegian nationalism and the 400 years of Danish rule in Norway (see Denmark-Norway). The koiné language (mixed language) known as Dano-Norwegian (Dansk-Norsk) which developed in Norwegian cities was the result of Danish replacing Norwegian as the language of the upper classes in that country (Danish was used in the courts of law and by the ruling class, and after the Lutheran Reformation of 1536 it replaced Latin as a liturgical language). The adoption of a few elements of Norwegian orthography into the Danish language gave rise to the written standard of Riksmål, which later became Bokmål. Nynorsk, a new standard of Norwegian based upon the spoken language in rural Norway, was acknowledged by the parliament in 1885, and in 1892 it was first possible to use Nynorsk as a language of primary instruction. By 1920, Nynorsk was being used widely in western Norway and the mountain valleys, where it still has its stronghold, and Bokmål was used in the more populous areas of the country. Later, attempts were made to reconcile the two standards into Samnorsk, or "Common Norwegian", although this never came to fruition.

=== Bokmål ===
Bokmål, the written language of some 80% of the Norwegian population and understood by practically the entire population, is based on a combination of Danish and Nynorsk. It differs from its mostly Danish predecessor Riksmål in terms of genders, lexicon, counting system, a tendency to permit concrete noun endings in abstract situations and diphthongs versus single vowels. Riksmål was officially changed to Bokmål in 1929.

=== Nynorsk ===
Nynorsk was developed by the linguist Ivar Aasen in the 1850s, based on rural, spoken Norwegian, rather than the cultured, Danish-influenced Norwegian spoken in cities. Its first official codification was in 1901, was given the name Nynorsk in 1929, and has been used officially (alongside Bokmål) since 1938. Its usage, however has declined: in 1944 it was used by 34.1% (the highest recorded number), in 1971 by 17.5% of the population, today, some 15% of schoolchildren are taught Nynorsk as their written language, and Nynorsk is reportedly used as the main form of Norwegian by around 7.4% of the total population, whereas an additional 5% switch between Bokmål and Nynorsk.

Nynorsk is most commonly used in the western and southern parts of Norway, and is much less common in areas within range of European route E6 (Eastern Norway, Trøndelag, and northern Norway). Though Nynorsk is understood by a large majority of the country's population, it is not widely understood among teenagers, and it is frequently discussed whether to continue to make Nynorsk obligatory in schooling or not.

Høgnorsk

A more conservative variation of Nynorsk exists, called Høgnorsk. It has few active users, but is supported by the Ivar Aasen-sambandet organization, founded in 1965 in response to the samnorsk policy of the government at the time.

== Sámi languages ==
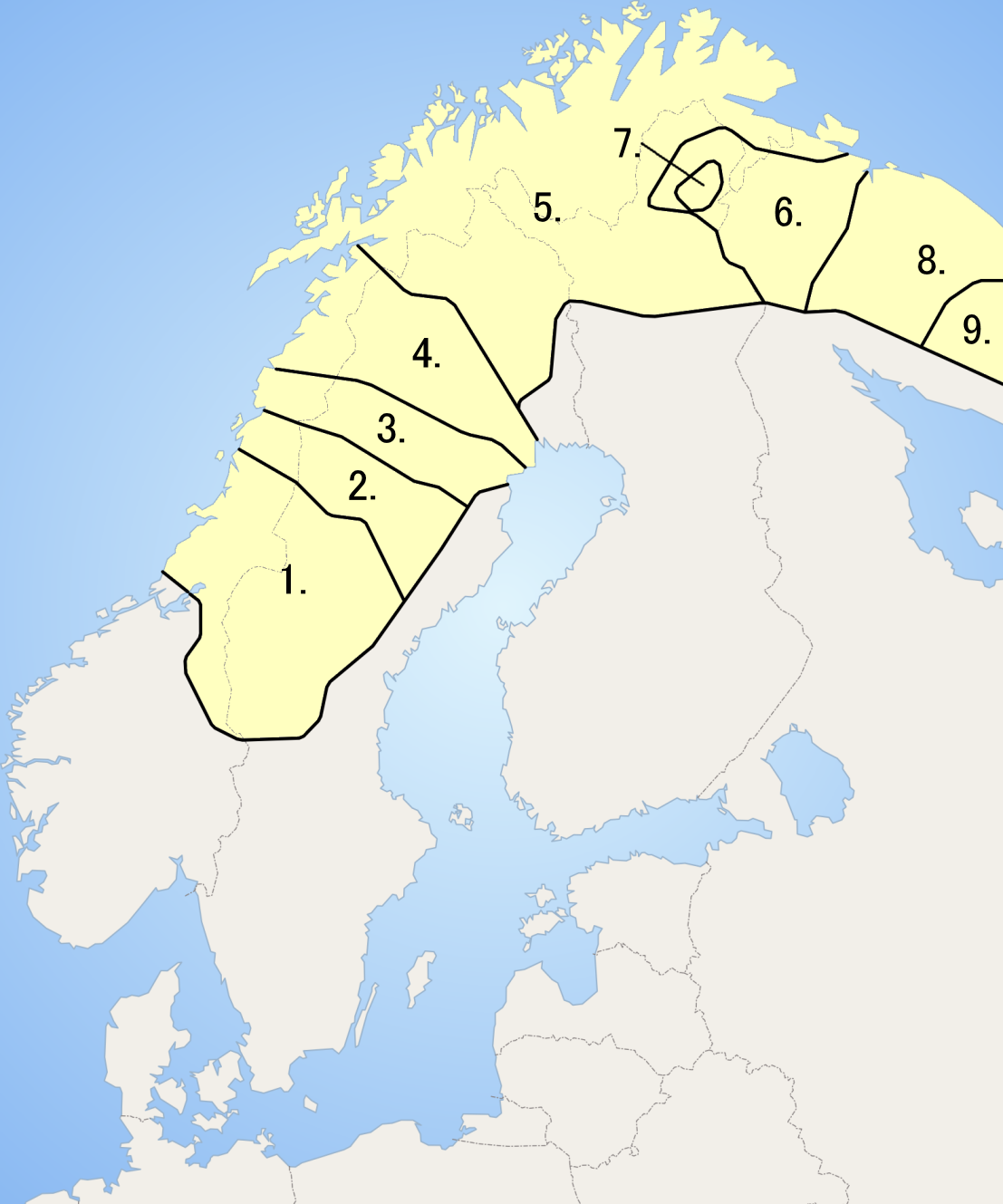
Traditional geographic distribution of the Sami languages: 1. South Sami, 4. Lule Sami, 5. Northern Sami

The Sami people are indigenous to Northern Scandinavia, and though they have largely adopted Norwegian, Swedish, Finnish, or Russian—due in no small part to official assimilation policies—some still speak their indigenous Sámi languages. Alongside speaking those languages, practically all speakers of Sámi languages in Norway also have Bokmål as their second or first language.

Sámi languages, like Kven and Finnish, belong to the Uralic language family. By far the most spoken form of Sami in Norway is Northern Sámi, spoken by around 15,000 Sami in Norway, equivalent to approximately 0.27% of the population. The others are Lule Sámi (spoken by around 500 in Norway; 0.01%) and South Sámi (which has around 300 speakers in Norway). Sámi and Norwegian are the official languages of Norway, and Sámi is protected by the constitution.

== Kven ==
The county of Finnmark

The county of Troms

Spoken by the Kven people, the Kven language is a Finnic language, closely related to Finnish, and spoken by between 5,000 and 8,000 people (equivalent of up to 0.15% of the population) in northeastern Norway, particularly in Tromsø (in Troms county) and also in Finnmark county. Mirroring the situation of Meänkieli in Sweden, Kven is sometimes considered to be a dialect of Finnish, and has a large degree of mutual intelligibility with the language.

== Romani ==
The Romani people are a traditionally travelling people with roots/heritage from India, and today are spread across all of Europe.

The Romani language, an Indo-European, Indo-Aryan language (related to other languages spoken in India today), is split into a great number of dialects. Two of these, Tavringer Romani and Vlax Romani, are spoken in Norway, by populations of 6,000 and 500, respectively.

Scandoromani is another Romani dialect indigenous to Norway, as well as Sweden. It is spoken by Romanisæl (Tater) Travellers. Because of the wandering nature of the Romani people, there is no geographic stronghold of the Romani language in Norway.

== Norwegian Traveller (Rodi) ==
Spoken by the Indigenous Norwegian Travellers, a traditionally Itinerant population who almost exclusively inhabit Southwestern and Southern Norway which have a mixture from Romanisæl, also known as Tater (Norwegian & Swedish Romani) and Yeniche (German Traveller) populations.

The Norwegian Traveller language, also known as Rodi, is based on Norwegian, but has heavy lexicon borrowing from Romani and German Rotwelsch. Rotwelsch lexicon has entered through the Yeniche, and Romani lexicon has entered both from the Scandoromani spoken by the Romanisæl (Tater) Travellers of Norway and the Sinti-Romani dialect, as German Rotwelsch has Sinti influences.

Despite the lexicon of Romani and German Rotwelsch origin, the syntax, grammar and morphology of Rodi is entirely Nordic. Despite intermarriages and admixture from Yeniche Travellers and Romanisæl Travellers, Indigenous Norwegian Travellers have retained their own distinct culture, history, traditions, identity and history.

There is no estimate on how many Norwegian Traveller speakers there are in Norway, but it is known that the language is alive.

== Foreign languages ==
In 2017, Norway's immigrant population consisted of 883,751 people, making up 16.8% of the country's total population (this includes both foreign-born and Norwegian-born with two foreign-born parents, and four foreign-born grandparents). Of this number, 724,987 are foreign-born, while 158,764 are Norwegian-born with foreign-born parents. The ten most common countries of origin of immigrants residing in Norway are Poland (97,197), Lithuania (37,638), Sweden (36,315), Somalia (28,696), Germany (24,601), Iraq (22,493), Syria (20,823), Philippines (20,537), Pakistan (19,973) and Eritrea (19,957). The immigrant population comprises people from a total of 221 countries and autonomous regions, but 25% of the immigrants are from one of four migrant groups: Polish, Lithuanians, Swedes and Somalis.

Residents of Norway by non-native first-language (2012, estimation)
Language	No. of speakers
Serbo-Croatian	12,250
Arabic	11,489
English	11,130
Somali	10,904
Kurdish	7,100
Tigrinya	5,552
Dari	5,212
Russian	5,062
Persian	4,929
Albanian	4,535

=== English ===
In 2013, there were approximately 4.5 million people in Norway who were capable of conversing in English to some extent, out of a population of 5.1 million. The country currently scores in the top 5 of the EF English Proficiency Index along with its Nordic neighbours.

=== Other foreign languages ===
While pupils can pick German, French, or Spanish from Year 8 onwards, which becomes mandatory from Year 11 onwards, fluency in those languages is very low in Norway.

Swedish, being significantly mutually intelligible, is well understood, and speakers of Norwegian and Swedish will usually converse verbally in their languages or in various versions of Svorsk instead of conversing in English. In regards to school classes and credits, Swedish is not considered a true foreign language, as there are no class subjects specifically for Swedish, and thus no exams or university credits dedicated to it either; some Swedish is taught as part of regular Norwegian classes from circa Year 7 onwards.
