= Modern Norwegian =

Form of the Norwegian language after the 16th century

- Moderne norsk; Standard østnorsk (Standard East Norwegian), Høydansk (High Danish)
- Region: Norway
- Era: 16th century to present
- Language family: Indo-European: Germanic; North Germanic; Continental Scandinavian; Norwegian Danish; Modern Norwegian
- Early forms: Old Norse: Old West Norse Old East Norse; Old Norwegian Old Danish; Middle Norwegian Medieval Danish; Norwegian dialects Dano-Norwegian
- Writing system: Latin

Language codes
- ISO 639-1: no
- ISO 639-2: nor
- ISO 639-3: nor
- Glottolog: None

Modern Norwegian (Norwegian: moderne norsk) is the Norwegian language that emerged after the Middle Norwegian transition period (1350–1536) until and including today. The transition to Modern Norwegian is usually dated to 1525, or 1536, the year of the Protestant Reformation and the beginning of the kingdoms of Denmark–Norway (1537–1814). It can be further divided into Early Modern Norway (1536-1848) until the separation from Denmark, and Newer Modern Norwegian from then to now.

In contrast to Old Norse, Modern Norwegian has simplified inflections and a more fixed syntax. Old Norse vocabulary is to a considerable degree substituted by Low German, and this is the main reason why Modern Norwegian, together with contemporary Norwegian in general, Danish and Swedish, is no longer mutually intelligible with Insular Nordic (Icelandic and Faroese), except from some Nynorsk/Høgnorsk and dialect users to a lesser extent.

While Modern Norwegian is a linguistic term with a specific historical meaning, contemporary Norwegian also includes the Dano-Norwegian koiné dialect from Oslo, that evolved into Standard Østnorsk (Standard East Norwegian) and the related official written standard Bokmål. Standard Østnorsk is spoken by a large and rapidly growing minority of Norwegians in East Norway, and Bokmål is by far the most widely used written language, even among users of Modern Norwegian dialects.
