= Alf Hellevik =

Norwegian philologist

Alf Hellevik (28 June 1909 – 8 November 2001) was a Norwegian philologist.

He was born in Fjaler Municipality. He graduated as cand.philol. from the University of Oslo in 1938. He was the principal editor of the multi-volume dictionary Norsk Ordbok from 1948 to 1978. He lectured at the University of Oslo from 1972 until his retirement in 1977. He edited several editions of Nynorsk Ordliste. From 1952 to 1970 he was a member of Norsk Språknemnd, and a member of the Norwegian Language Council from 1972 to 1988.

He resided at Hosle during his working career, but later moved back to Sunnfjord. He died in November 2001 in Askvoll Municipality.

== See also ==
- Spynorsk mordliste
