= Høgnorsk =

Unofficial Norwegian written standard language

Norwegian Høgnorsk
- høgnorsk / landsmål
- Region: Norway
- Era: 19th century to present
- Language family: Indo-European: Germanic; North Germanic; West Scandinavian; Norwegian; Norwegian dialects; Norwegian Høgnorsk
- Early forms: Old Norse: Old West Norse; Old Norwegian; Middle Norwegian; Norwegian dialects
- Writing system: Latin

Language codes
- ISO 639-1: no
- ISO 639-2: nor
- ISO 639-3: nor
- Glottolog: None
- IETF: nn-hognorsk

Høgnorsk (Norwegian pronunciation: [ˈhø̂ːɡnɔʁsk, ˈhø̂ːɡnɔʂk]; meaning High Norwegian) is a term for varieties of the Norwegian language from Nynorsk that reject most of the official reforms that have been introduced since the creation of Landsmål. Høgnorsk typically accepts the initial reforms that, among other things, removed certain silent letters of etymological origin, while keeping most of the Landsmål grammar intact.

Torleiv Hannaas is often credited for introducing the term Høgnorsk in an article in 1922. He used it analogously to High German (Hochdeutsch), pointing out that Ivar Aasen, the creator of Nynorsk orthography, had especially valued the dialects of the mountainous areas of middle and western Norway, as opposed to the dialects of the lowlands of eastern Norway, which Hannaas called flatnorsk (Flat Norwegian, like Plattdeutsch).

The written High Norwegian language is a tradition originating from the first version of the New Norwegian written language (then called Landsmål), as it was built by Ivar Aasen and later used by classical New Norwegian authors as Aasmund Olavsson Vinje, Arne Garborg, Olav Nygard and Olav H. Hauge.

The Høgnorsk movement grew out of opposition to the official Samnorsk policy which aimed at leveling out the differences between Nynorsk and the other main variety of Norwegian language, Bokmål. Reforms to this end were carried through in 1938 and 1959. Initially there was considerable resistance to these reforms, but the resulting standard is now widely accepted. Høgnorsk is currently supported by Ivar Aasen-sambandet and the activists behind Målmannen, but has relatively few active users.

The basis for the High Norwegian language direction is a wish to preserve the New Norwegian written language as an independent language, free of the strong influence from Bokmål that today's Nynorsk has.
