= Vikør =

Vikør may refer to:

- Vikør, former name for Kvam Municipality, Norway
- Lars Vikør (born 1946), Norwegian linguist, translator and educator

== See also ==
- Vicor Corporation
