= Spynorsk mordliste =

Derogatory term for the Nynorsk standard of written Norwegian

Spynorsk mordliste (Norwegian: [ˈspỳːnɔʂk ˈmʊrd.lɪstə], literally "Spew-Norwegian Murder List") is a derogatory term meant to disparage Nynorsk, one of the two official standards of written Norwegian. It is a pun on Nynorsk ordliste, the title of the "New Norwegian Word List", a Nynorsk dictionary.

== Background ==
Nynorsk ordliste was first published in 1938; the eleventh edition came in 2012.

Learning to write both of the written standards of Norwegian, Nynorsk and Bokmål, is compulsory in Norwegian schools. Among student users of Bokmål in some areas, mockery of Nynorsk became widespread toward the end of the 20th century. For example they would use a pen to change the cover title of Nynorsk ordliste to "Spynorsk mordliste".

== Significance ==
Anthropologist Thomas Hylland Eriksen, in his 1993 book Typisk norsk (Typical Norwegian), suggested "Spynorsk mordliste" [sic] as being among typical Norwegian cultural traits—meaning that the term has a certain connotation for many Norwegians.

The term has also been used in politics. In the run-up to the 2005 parliamentary election, the Conservative politician Harald Victor Hove from Hordaland gained some attention for burning a copy of Nynorsk ordliste as a part of his campaign. He referred to the book as "'Spynorsk mordliste', as we used to call it". During debates in the city council of Oslo—a Bokmål stronghold—the term has also been used. Progress Party politician Anette Carnarius Elseth spoke to limit compulsory school writing to one of the written standards only, and added that she and others used to change the name of the dictionary to "Spynorsk mordliste". In another debate, Conservative politician Øystein Sundelin claimed—rhetorically—that "regrettably, more than half" of the school attenders in Oslo have written "Spynorsk mordliste" on their dictionaries.
