= Norsk referansegrammatikk =

Norwegian language reference book

- Author: Jan Terje Faarlund, Svein Lie, Kjell Ivar Vannebo
- Language: Norwegian
- Publisher: Universitetsforlaget
- Publication date: 1997
- ISBN: 82-00-22569-0

Norsk referansegrammatikk (NRG) is a reference book on the grammar of the Norwegian language that was published in 1997. It was written by Jan Terje Faarlund, Svein Lie, and Kjell Ivar Vannebo. The result of three years of research at two universities, it has been described as "the most extensive grammar ever published on the Norwegian language".

NRG was written alongside similar texts for Swedish, Danish and Finnish. It contains 1223 pages, although shorter than the other Nordic reference grammars, it remains the central work on Norwegian grammar. None of the comparable works are as comprehensive as NRG.

NRG covers both Bokmål and Nynorsk.
