= Lars Vikør =

Norwegian linguist, translator and educator (born 1946)

Lars Sigurdsson Vikør (born 30 April 1946) is a Norwegian linguist, translator and educator.

== Biography ==
Lars Vikør is a graduate of the University of Oslo and the University of Leiden. He is a professor of Scandinavian languages and linguistics and specialist in Nynorsk lexicography at the University of Oslo. He is the main editor of the Norwegian Dictionary (Norsk Ordbok). He has also engaged in the National Association for Language Collection (Landslaget for språklig samling).

Vikør has written books and articles on sociolinguistics, language politics, and modern language history, notably The New Norse Language Movement. He has devoted himself for Samnorsk—towards language equality between Norway's two competing written language forms, Nynorsk and Bokmål, and has been a representative of the Norwegian Language Council.

== Selected works ==
- The New Norse language movement (1975)
- Sprakpolitikk pa fem kontinent: Eit oversyn og ei jamføring (1977)
- Perfecting spelling: Spelling discussions and reforms in Indonesia and Malaysia, 1900–1972 (1988)
- The Nordic languages: Their status and interrelations (1993)
- Aust-Timor, ein nasjon under jernhælen (1994)
