= Ivar Aasen-sambandet =

Norwegian language association

Ivar Aasen-sambandet (The Ivar Aasen Union) is an umbrella organization of associations and individuals promoting the use of the Høgnorsk variant of the Norwegian language.

== History ==
The union was founded in 1965 as a response to the samnorsk policy (aiming to merge the two languages Nynorsk and Bokmål) prevailing with Noregs Mållag (Norwegian Language Union).

In 2002, Norway officially abandoned the samnorsk policy, like the majority of Noregs Mållag did during the 1990s. This decade also saw the revitalization of the Høgnorsk movement, which took place inside of Noregs Mållag as well. The split between the two movements was now only organizational, and the Høgnorsk movement no longer looked upon the other part as an enemy; however, it maintained that it had "a certain task" in the common works on the Norwegian language.
