= Norwegian language =

North Germanic language

Norwegian
- norsk
- Pronunciation: [ˈnɔʂːk] (East, Central and North) [ˈnɔʁsk] (West and South)
- Native to: Norway
- Ethnicity: Norwegians
- Native speakers: 4.32 million (2012)
- Language family: Indo-European: Germanic; Northwest Germanic; North Germanic; West Scandinavian; Norwegian
- Early forms: Old Norse: Old West Norse; Old Norwegian; Middle Norwegian
- Standard forms: written Bokmål (official); • written Riksmål (unofficial); written Nynorsk (official); • written Høgnorsk (unofficial)
- Writing system: Latin (Norwegian alphabet); Norwegian Braille

Official status
- Official language in: Norway; Nordic Council
- Regulated by: Language Council of Norway (Bokmål and Nynorsk); Norwegian Academy (Riksmål); Ivar Aasen-sambandet (Høgnorsk)

Language codes
- ISO 639-1: no
- ISO 639-2: nor
- ISO 639-3: nor – inclusive code Individual codes: nob – Bokmål nno – Nynorsk
- Glottolog: norw1258
- Linguasphere: 52-AAA-ba to -be; 52-AAA-cf to -cg
- Norwegian-speaking areas, including North Dakota, where 0.4% of the population speaks Norwegian (Data: U.S. Census 2000).

Norwegian (endonym: norsk [ˈnɔʂːk], norsk språk [ˈnɔʂːk sproːk]) is a North Germanic language from the Indo-European language family spoken mainly in Norway, where it is an official language. Along with Swedish and Danish, Norwegian forms a dialect continuum of more or less mutually intelligible local and regional varieties; some Norwegian and Swedish dialects, in particular, are very close. These Scandinavian languages, together with Faroese and Icelandic as well as some extinct languages, constitute the North Germanic languages. Faroese and Icelandic are not mutually intelligible with Norwegian in their spoken form because continental Scandinavian has diverged from them. While the two Germanic languages with the greatest numbers of speakers, English and German, have close similarities with Norwegian, neither is mutually intelligible with it. Norwegian is a descendant of Old Norse, the common language of the Germanic peoples living in Scandinavia during the Viking Age.

Today there are two official forms of written Norwegian, Bokmål (Riksmål) and Nynorsk (Landsmål), each with its own variants. Bokmål developed from the Dano-Norwegian language that replaced Middle Norwegian as the elite language after the union of Denmark–Norway in the 16th and 17th centuries and then evolved in Norway, while Nynorsk was developed based upon a collective of spoken Norwegian dialects. Norwegian is one of the two official languages in Norway, along with Sámi, a group of Finno-Ugric languages spoken by the Indigenous people of the same name. Norwegian is one of the working languages of the Nordic Council. Under the Nordic Language Convention, citizens of the Nordic countries who speak Norwegian have the opportunity to use it when interacting with official bodies in other Nordic countries without being liable for any interpretation or translation costs.

== History ==
=== Origins ===
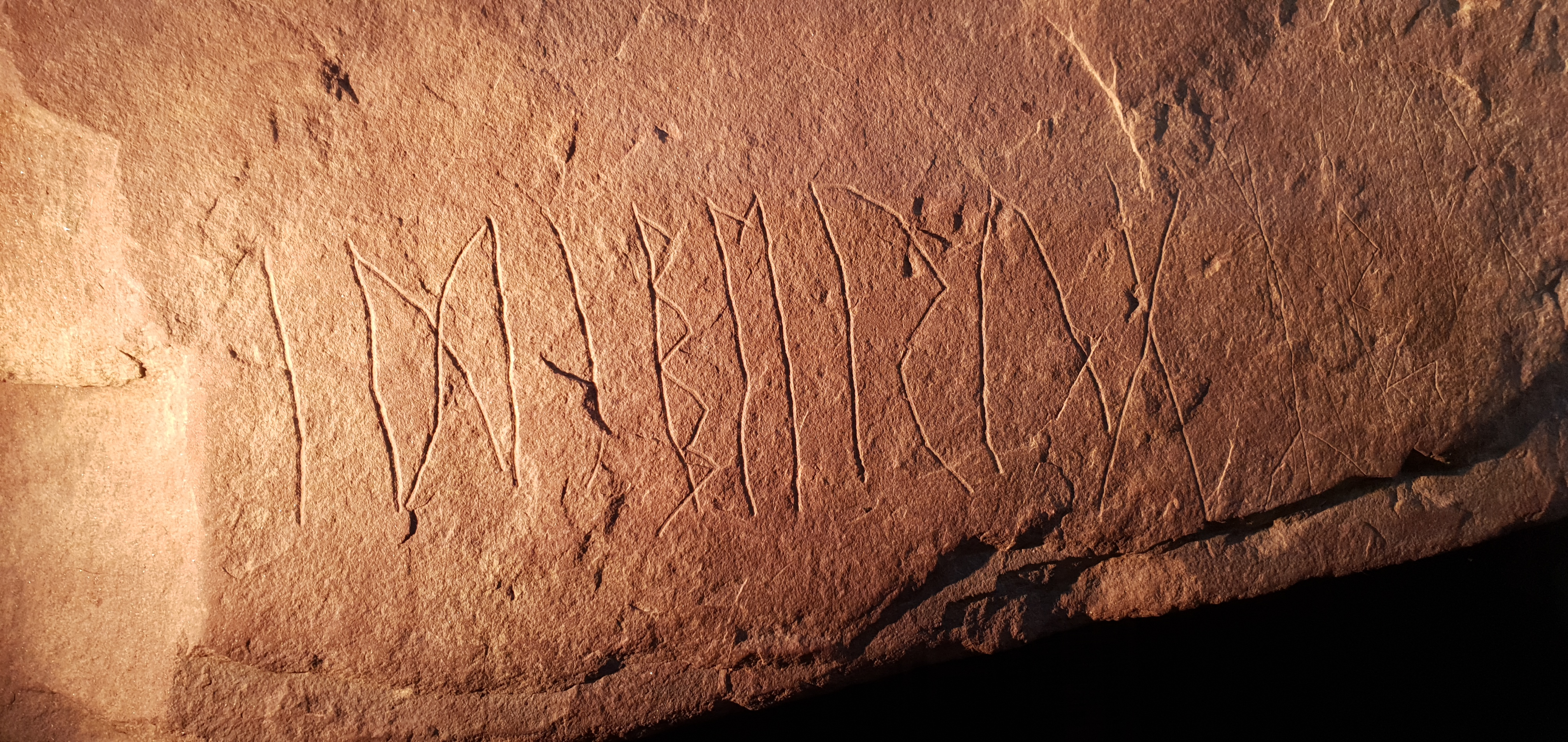
Close-up of the "idiberug/n" inscription on the Hole Runestone dating between 1 and 250 CE. Believed to be the oldest writing in Norway and rest of the Nordics to date.

The approximate extent of Old Norse and related languages in the early 10th century: Old West Norse dialect Old East Norse dialect Old Gutnish dialect Old English Crimean Gothic Other Germanic languages with which Old Norse still retained some mutual intelligibility

Like most of the languages in Europe, Norwegian derives from Proto-Indo-European. As early Indo-Europeans spread across Europe, they became isolated from each other and new languages developed. In northwest Europe, the Germanic languages evolved, further branching off into the North Germanic languages, of which Norwegian is one.

Proto-Norse is thought to have evolved as a northern dialect of Proto-Germanic during the first centuries AD in what is today Southern Sweden. It is the earliest stage of a characteristically North Germanic language, and the language attested in the Elder Futhark inscriptions, the oldest form of the runic alphabets. A number of inscriptions are memorials to the dead, while others are magical in content. The oldest are carved on loose objects, while later ones are chiseled in runestones. They are the oldest written record of any Germanic language.

- Proto-Germanic
  - East Germanic languages
  - West Germanic languages
  - Proto-Norse →
    - Old Norse
      - Old West Norse
        - Icelandic
        - Faroese
        - Norwegian
      - Old East Norse
        - Danish
        - Swedish

Around 800 AD, the script was simplified to the Younger Futhark, and inscriptions became more abundant. At the same time, the beginning of the Viking Age led to the spread of Old Norse to Iceland, Greenland, and the Faroe Islands. Viking colonies also existed in parts of the British Isles, France (Normandy), North America, and Kievan Rus. In all of these places except Iceland and the Faroes, Old Norse speakers went extinct or were absorbed into the local population.

=== The Latin alphabet ===
Around 1030, Christianity came to Scandinavia, bringing with it an influx of Latin borrowings and the Latin alphabet. These new words were related to church practices and ceremonies, although many other loanwords related to general culture also entered the language.

The Scandinavian languages at this time are not considered to be separate languages, although there were minor differences among what are customarily called Old Icelandic, Old Norwegian, Old Gutnish, Old Danish, and Old Swedish.

=== Low German influence ===
The economic and political dominance of the Hanseatic League between 1250 and 1450 in the main Scandinavian cities brought large Middle Low German–speaking populations to Norway. The influence of their language on Scandinavian is comparable with that of French on English after the Norman conquest.

=== Decline of written Norwegian ===
In the late Middle Ages, dialects began to develop in Scandinavia because the population was rural and little travel occurred. When the Reformation came from Germany, Martin Luther's High German translation of the Bible was quickly translated into Swedish, Danish, and Icelandic. Norway entered a union with Denmark in 1397 and Danish, over time, replaced Middle Norwegian as the language of the elite, the church, literature, and the law. When the union with Denmark ended in 1814, the Dano-Norwegian koiné had become the mother tongue of around 1% of the population.

=== Danish to Norwegian standardisation ===
From the 1840s, some writers experimented with a Norwegianised form of written Danish. Knud Knudsen proposed to change spelling and inflection in accordance with the Dano-Norwegian koiné, known as "cultivated everyday speech." A small adjustment in this direction was implemented in the first official reform of the Danish language in Norway in 1862 and more extensively after his death in two official reforms in 1907 and 1917.

Meanwhile, a nationalistic movement strove for the development of a new written Norwegian. Ivar Aasen, a botanist and self-taught linguist, began his work to create a new Norwegian language at the age of 22. He traveled around the country collecting words and examples of grammar from the dialects and comparing the dialects among the different regions. He examined the development of Icelandic, which had largely escaped the influences under which Norwegian had come. He called his work, which was published in several books from 1848 to 1873, Landsmål, meaning 'national language'. The name Landsmål is sometimes interpreted as 'rural language' or 'country language', but this was clearly not Aasen's intended meaning.

The name of the Danish language in Norway was a topic of hot dispute throughout the 19th century. Its proponents claimed that it was a language common to Norway and Denmark, and no more Danish than Norwegian. The proponents of Landsmål thought that the Danish character of the language should not be concealed. In 1899, Bjørnstjerne Bjørnson proposed the neutral name Riksmål, meaning 'national language' like Landsmål, and this was officially adopted along with the 1907 spelling reform. The name Riksmål is sometimes interpreted as 'state language', but this meaning is secondary at best. (Compare to Danish rigsmål from where the name was borrowed.)

After the personal union with Sweden was dissolved in 1905, both languages were developed further and reached what is now considered their classic forms after a reform in 1917. Riksmål was, in 1929, officially renamed Bokmål (literally 'book language'), and Landsmål to Nynorsk (literally 'new Norwegian'). A proposition to substitute Danish-Norwegian (dansk-norsk) for Bokmål lost in parliament by a single vote. The name Nynorsk, the linguistic term for modern Norwegian, was chosen to contrast with Danish and emphasise the historical connection to Old Norwegian. Today, this meaning is often lost, and it is commonly mistaken as a "new" Norwegian in contrast to the "real" Norwegian Bokmål.

Bokmål and Nynorsk were made closer by a reform in 1938. This was a result of a state policy to merge Nynorsk and Bokmål into a single language, to be called Samnorsk. A 1946 poll showed that this policy was supported by 79% of Norwegians at the time. However, opponents of the official policy still managed to create a massive protest movement against Samnorsk in the 1950s, fighting in particular the use of "radical" forms in Bokmål text books in schools. In the reform in 1959, the 1938 reform was partially reversed in Bokmål, but Nynorsk was changed further towards Bokmål. Since then Bokmål has reverted even further toward traditional Riksmål, while Nynorsk still adheres to the 1959 standard. Therefore, a small minority of Nynorsk enthusiasts use a more conservative standard called Høgnorsk. The Samnorsk policy had little influence after 1960, and was officially abandoned in 2002.

== Phonology ==
While the sound systems of Norwegian and Swedish are similar, considerable variation exists among the dialects.

=== Consonants ===
Consonant phonemes of Urban East Norwegian
		Labial	Dental/ Alveolar	Retroflex	(Alveolo-) Palatal	Velar	Glottal
Nasal		m	n	(ɳ)		ŋ	
Plosive	voiceless	p	t	(ʈ)		k	(ʔ)
Plosive	voiced	b	d	(ɖ)		ɡ	
Fricative		f	s	ʂ	ɕ ~ ç	(x)	h
Approximant		ʋ	l	(ɭ)	j		
Tap			ɾ ~ r	ɽ			

The retroflex consonants only appear in East Norwegian dialects as a result of sandhi, combining /ɾ/ with /d/, /l/, /n/, /s/, and /t/.

The realization of the rhotic /ɾ/ depends on the dialect. In Eastern, Central, and Northern Norwegian dialects, it is a flap [ɾ], whereas in Western and Southern Norway, and for some speakers also in Eastern Norway, it is uvular [ʁ] or [χ]. And in the dialects of North-Western Norway, it is realized as [r], much like the trilled ⟨rr⟩ of Spanish.

=== Vowels ===
Vowel phonemes of Urban East Norwegian
Orthography	IPA	Description	Examples	
a	/ɑ(ː)/	open back unrounded	bak	back
ai	/ɑɪ̯/		hai	shark
au, eu	/æʉ̯/		haug, Europa	hill, Europe
e (short)	/ɛ/, /æ/	open mid front unrounded	sett, fersk	seen, fresh
e (long)	/eː/, /æː/	close mid front unrounded	kne, der	knee, there
e (unstressed)	/ə/	mid central unrounded	jente	girl
ei	/æɪ̯/, /ɛɪ̯/		stein	stone
i (short)	/ɪ/	close front unrounded	trille	to trundle
i (long)	/iː/	close front unrounded	lik	corpse
o (short)	/ɔ/, /ʊ/	close back rounded	stokk, rom	cane, room
o (long)	/uː/, /oː/	close back rounded	mos, lov	mash, law
oi	/ɔʏ̯/		hoie	to shout ahoy
u	/ʉ(ː)/	close central rounded (close front endolabial)	ule	to howl
y (short)	/ʏ/	close front rounded (close front exolabial)	hytte	hut, cabin
y (long)	/yː/	close front rounded (close front exolabial)	ny	new
æ (short)	/æ/, /ɛ/	near open front unrounded, open mid front unrounded	fælt, ætt	bad, kin
æ (long)	/æː/, /eː/	near open front unrounded, close mid front unrounded	fjær, væte	feather, to wet
ø (short)	/œ/	open mid front rounded	løsne	to loosen
ø (long)	/øː/	close mid front rounded	smøre	to lubricate
øy	/œʏ̯/		gøy	fun
å (short)	/ɔ/	open-mid back rounded	slått	a type of folk dance
å (long)	/oː/	close-mid back rounded	båt	boat

=== Accent ===
Norwegian is a pitch-accent language with two distinct pitch patterns, like Swedish. They are used to differentiate two-syllable words with otherwise identical pronunciation. For example, in many East Norwegian dialects, the word bønder ('farmers') is pronounced using the simpler tone 1, while bønner ('beans' or 'prayers') uses the more complex tone 2. Though spelling differences occasionally differentiate written words, in most cases the minimal pairs are written alike, since written Norwegian has no explicit accent marks. In most eastern low-tone dialects, accent 1 uses a low flat pitch in the first syllable, while accent 2 uses a high, sharply falling pitch in the first syllable and a low pitch in the beginning of the second syllable. In both accents, these pitch movements are followed by a rise of intonational nature (phrase accent)—the size (and presence) of which signals emphasis or focus, and corresponds in function to the normal accent in languages that lack lexical tone, such as English. That rise culminates in the final syllable of an accentual phrase, while the utterance-final fall common in most languages is either very small or absent.

There are significant variations in pitch accent between dialects. Thus, in most of western and northern Norway (the so-called high-pitch dialects) accent 1 is falling, while accent 2 is rising in the first syllable and falling in the second syllable or somewhere around the syllable boundary. The pitch accents (as well as the peculiar phrase accent in the low-tone dialects) give the Norwegian language a "singing" quality that makes it easy to distinguish from other languages. Accent 1 generally occurs in words that were monosyllabic in Old Norse, and accent 2 in words that were polysyllabic.

== Written language ==
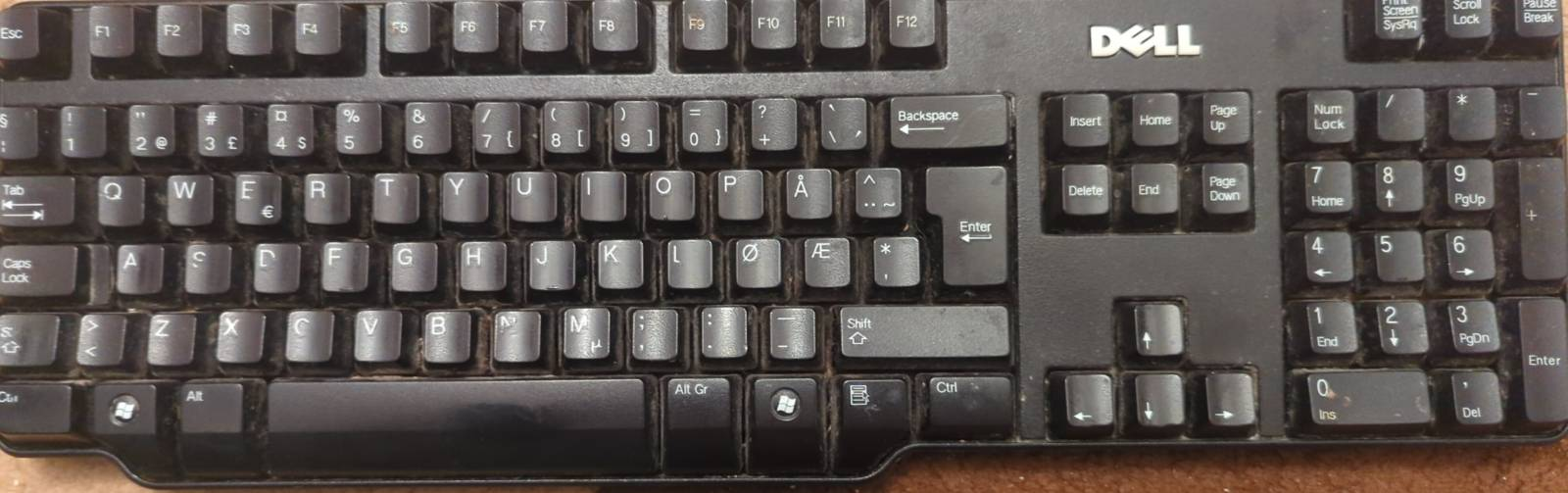
Norwegian keyboard with keys for Æ, Ø, and Å

=== Alphabet ===
The Norwegian alphabet has 29 letters.

A	B	C	D	E	F	G	H	I	J	K	L	M	N	O	P	Q	R	S	T	U	V	W	X	Y	Z	Æ	Ø	Å
a	b	c	d	e	f	g	h	i	j	k	l	m	n	o	p	q	r	s	t	u	v	w	x	y	z	æ	ø	å

The letters c, q, w, x and z are only used in loanwords. As loanwords are assimilated into Norwegian, their spelling might change to reflect Norwegian pronunciation and the principles of Norwegian orthography, e.g. zebra in Norwegian is written sebra. Due to historical reasons, some otherwise Norwegian family names are also written using these letters.

The letter x can be transcribed by ks in some words in Norwegian.

Some letters may be modified by diacritics: é, è, ê, ó, ò, and ô. In Nynorsk, ì and ù and ỳ are occasionally seen as well. The diacritics are not compulsory, but may in a few cases distinguish between different meanings of the word, e.g.: for ('for/to'), fór ('went'), fòr ('furrow') and fôr ('fodder'). Loanwords may be spelled with other diacritics, most notably ï, ü, á and à.

=== Bokmål and Nynorsk ===
Map of the official language forms of Norwegian municipalities: red is Bokmål, blue is Nynorsk, and gray depicts neutral areas.

The two legally recognized forms of written Norwegian are Bokmål (literally 'book tongue') and Nynorsk ('new Norwegian'), which are regulated by the Language Council of Norway (Språkrådet). Two other written forms without official status also exist. One, called Riksmål ('national language'), is today to a large extent the same language as Bokmål though somewhat closer to the Danish language. It is regulated by the unofficial Norwegian Academy, which translates the name as 'Standard Norwegian'. The other is Høgnorsk ('High Norwegian'), a more purist form of Nynorsk, which maintains the language in an original form as given by Ivar Aasen and rejects most of the reforms from the 20th century; this form has limited use.

Nynorsk and Bokmål provide standards for how to write Norwegian, but not for how to speak the language. No standard of spoken Norwegian is officially sanctioned, and most Norwegians speak their own dialects in all circumstances. Thus, unlike in many other countries, the use of any Norwegian dialect, whether it coincides with the written norms or not, is accepted as correct spoken Norwegian. However, in areas where East Norwegian dialects are used, a tendency exists to accept a de facto spoken standard for this particular regional dialect, Urban East Norwegian or Standard East Norwegian (Norwegian: Standard østnorsk), in which the vocabulary coincides with Bokmål. Outside Eastern Norway, this spoken variation is not used.

From the 16th to the 19th centuries, Danish was the standard written language of Norway. As a result, the development of modern written Norwegian has been subject to strong controversy related to nationalism, rural versus urban discourse, and Norway's literary history. Historically, Bokmål is a Norwegianised variety of Danish, while Nynorsk is a language form based on Norwegian dialects and puristic opposition to Danish. The now-abandoned official policy to merge Bokmål and Nynorsk into one common language called Samnorsk through a series of spelling reforms has created a wide spectrum of varieties of both Bokmål and Nynorsk. The unofficial form known as Riksmål is considered more conservative than Bokmål and is far closer to Danish while the unofficial Høgnorsk is more conservative than Nynorsk and is far closer to Faroese, Icelandic and Old Norse.

Norwegians are educated in both Bokmål and Nynorsk. Each student gets assigned a native form based on which school they go to, whence the other form (known as Sidemål) will be a mandatory school subject from elementary school through high school. For instance, a Norwegian whose main language form is Bokmål will study Nynorsk as a mandatory subject throughout both elementary and high school. A 2005 poll indicates that 86.3% use primarily Bokmål as their daily written language, 5.5% use both Bokmål and Nynorsk, and 7.5% use primarily Nynorsk.Broadly speaking, Nynorsk writing is widespread in western Norway, though not in major urban areas, and also in the upper parts of mountain valleys in the southern and eastern parts of Norway. Examples are Setesdal, the western part of Telemark county (fylke) and several municipalities in Hallingdal, Valdres, and Gudbrandsdalen. It is little used elsewhere, but 30–40 years ago, it also had strongholds in many rural parts of Trøndelag (mid-Norway) and the southern part of northern Norway (Nordland county). Today, Nynorsk is the official language of not only four of the nineteen Norwegian counties but also various municipalities in five other counties. NRK, the Norwegian broadcasting corporation, broadcasts in both Bokmål and Nynorsk, and all governmental agencies are required to support both written languages. Bokmål is used in 92% of all written publications, and Nynorsk in 8% (2000).

Like some other European countries, Norway has an official "advisory board"— Språkrådet (Norwegian Language Council)— that determines, after approval from the Ministry of Culture, official spelling, grammar, and vocabulary for the Norwegian language. The board's work has been subject to considerable controversy throughout the years.

Both Nynorsk and Bokmål have a great variety of optional forms. The Bokmål that uses the forms that are close to Riksmål is called moderate or conservative, depending on one's viewpoint, while the Bokmål that uses the forms that are close to Nynorsk is called radical. Nynorsk has forms that are close to the original Landsmål and forms that are close to Bokmål.

=== Riksmål ===
Opponents of the spelling reforms aimed at bringing Bokmål closer to Nynorsk have retained the name Riksmål and employ spelling and grammar that predate the Samnorsk movement. Riksmål and conservative versions of Bokmål have been the de facto standard written language of Norway for most of the 20th century, being used by large newspapers, encyclopedias, and a significant proportion of the population of the capital Oslo, surrounding areas, and other urban areas, as well as much of the literary tradition. Since the reforms of 1981 and 2003 (effective in 2005), the official Bokmål can be adapted to be almost identical with modern Riksmål. The differences between written Riksmål and Bokmål are comparable to American and British English differences.

Riksmål is regulated by the Norwegian Academy, which determines acceptable spelling, grammar, and vocabulary.

=== Høgnorsk ===
There is also an unofficial form of Nynorsk, called Høgnorsk, discarding the post-1917 reforms, and thus close to Ivar Aasen's original Landsmål. It is supported by Ivar Aasen-sambandet, but has found no widespread use.

=== Current usage ===
In 2010, 86.5% of the pupils in the primary and lower secondary schools in Norway receive education in Bokmål, while 13.0% receive education in Nynorsk. From the eighth grade onwards, pupils are required to learn both. Out of the 431 municipalities in Norway, 161 have declared that they wish to communicate with the central authorities in Bokmål, 116 (representing 12% of the population) in Nynorsk, while 156 are neutral. Of 4,549 state publications in 2000, 8% were in Nynorsk, and 92% in Bokmål. The large national newspapers (Aftenposten, Dagbladet, and VG) are published in Bokmål or Riksmål. Some major regional newspapers (including Bergens Tidende and Stavanger Aftenblad), many political journals, and many local newspapers use both Bokmål and Nynorsk.

A newer trend is to write in dialect for informal use. When writing an SMS, Facebook update, or fridge note, many people, especially young ones, write approximations of the way they talk rather than using Bokmål or Nynorsk.

== Dialects ==
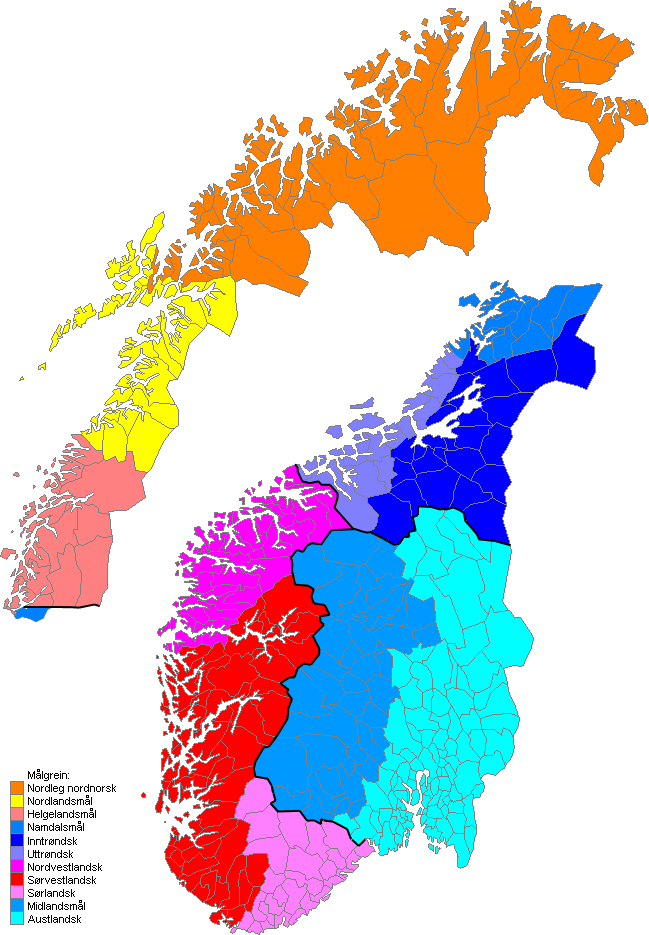
The map shows the division of the Norwegian dialects within the main groups.

There is general agreement that a wide range of differences makes it difficult to estimate the number of different Norwegian dialects. Variations in grammar, syntax, vocabulary, and pronunciation cut across geographical boundaries and can create a distinct dialect at the level of farm clusters. Dialects are in some cases so dissimilar as to be unintelligible to unfamiliar listeners. Many linguists note a trend toward regionalization of dialects that diminishes the differences at such local levels; there is, however, a renewed interest in preserving dialects.

== Grammar ==
=== Nouns ===
Norwegian nouns are inflected for number (singular/plural) and for definiteness (indefinite/definite). In a few dialects, definite nouns are also inflected for the dative case.

Norwegian nouns belong to three noun classes (genders): masculine, feminine and neuter. All feminine nouns can optionally be inflected using masculine noun class morphology in Bokmål due to its Danish heritage. In comparison, the use of all three genders (including the feminine) is mandatory in Nynorsk.

All Norwegian dialects have traditionally retained all the three grammatical genders from Old Norse to some extent. The only exceptions are the dialect of Bergen and a few upper class sociolects at the west end of Oslo that have completely lost the feminine gender.

According to Marit Westergaard, approximately 80% of nouns in Norwegian are masculine.

Examples, nouns in Bokmål
	Singular		Plural	
	Indefinite	Definite	Indefinite	Definite
Masculine	en båt	båten	båter	båtene
Masculine	a boat	the boat	boats	the boats
Feminine	ei/en vogn	vogna/vognen	vogner	vognene
Feminine	a wagon	the wagon	wagons	the wagons
Neuter	et hus	huset	hus	husa/husene
Neuter	a house	the house	houses	the houses

Norwegian and other Scandinavian languages use a suffix to indicate definiteness of a noun, unlike English which has a separate article, the, to indicate the same.

In general, almost all nouns in Bokmål follow these patterns (like the words in the examples above):

Nouns in Bokmål
	Singular		Plural	
	Indefinite	Definite	Indefinite	Definite
Masculine	en	-en	-er	-ene
Feminine	ei/en	-a/-en	-er	-ene
Neuter	et	-et	-/-er	-a/-ene

In contrast, almost all nouns in Nynorsk follow these patterns (the noun gender system is more pronounced than in Bokmål):

Nouns in Nynorsk
	Singular		Plural	
	Indefinite	Definite	Indefinite	Definite
Masculine	ein	-en	-ar	-ane
Feminine	ei	-a	-er	-ene
Neuter	eit	-et	–	-a

Examples, nouns in Nynorsk
	Singular		Plural	
	Indefinite	Definite	Indefinite	Definite
Masculine	ein båt	båten	båtar	båtane
Masculine	a boat	the boat	boats	the boats
Feminine	ei vogn	vogna	vogner	vognene
Feminine	a wagon	the wagon	wagons	the wagons
Neuter	eit hus	huset	hus	husa
Neuter	a house	the house	houses	the houses

There is in general no way to infer what grammatical gender a specific noun has, but there are some patterns of nouns where the gender can be inferred. For instance, all nouns ending in -nad will be masculine in both Bokmål and Nynorsk (for instance the noun jobbsøknad, which means 'job application'). Most nouns ending in -ing will be feminine, like the noun forventning ('expectation').

There are some common irregular nouns, many of which are irregular in both Bokmål and Nynorsk, like the following:

Irregular noun, fot (foot)
	Singular		Plural	
	Indefinite	Definite	Indefinite	Definite
Bokmål	en fot	foten	føtter	føttene
Nynorsk	ein fot	foten	føter	føtene
English	a foot	the foot	feet	the feet

In Nynorsk, even though the irregular word fot is masculine, it is inflected like a feminine word in the plural. Another word with the same irregular inflection is son – søner ('son – sons').

In Nynorsk, nouns ending in -ing typically have masculine plural inflections, like the word dronning in the following table. But they are treated as feminine nouns in every other way.

Nynorsk, some irregular nouns
Gender	Nouns ending with -ing				English
Feminine	ei dronning	dronninga	dronningar	dronningane	queen
Plurals with umlaut (these irregularities also exist in Bokmål)
Feminine	ei bok	boka	bøker	bøkene	book
Feminine	ei hand	handa	hender	hendene	hand
Feminine	ei stong	stonga	stenger	stengene	rod
Feminine	ei tå	tåa	tær	tærne	toe
Plurals with no ending (these irregularities also exist in Bokmål)
Masculine	ein ting	tingen	ting	tinga	thing

==== Genitive of nouns ====
In general, the genitive case has died out in modern Norwegian and there are only some remnants of it in certain expressions: til fjells ('to the mountains'), til sjøs ('to the sea'). To show ownership, there is an enclitic -s similar to English -'s; Sondres flotte bil ('Sondre's nice car', Sondre being a personal name). There are also reflexive possessive pronouns, sin, si, sitt, sine; Det er Sondre sitt ('It is Sondre's'). In both Bokmål and modern Nynorsk, there is often a mix of both of these to mark possession, though it is more common in Nynorsk to use the reflexive pronouns; in Nynorsk use of the reflexive possessive pronouns is generally encouraged to avoid mixing the enclitic -s with the historical grammatical case remnants of the language. The reflexive pronouns agree in gender and number with the noun.

The enclitic -s in Norwegian evolved as a shorthand expression for the possessive pronouns sin, si, sitt and sine.

Examples
Norwegian (with pronoun)	Norwegian (with enclitic 's)	English
Jenta sin bil	Jentas bil	The girl's car
Mannen si kone	Mannens kone	The man's wife
Gutten sitt leketøy	Guttens leketøy	The boy's toy
Kona sine barn	Konas barn	The wife's children
Det er statsministeren sitt	Det er statsministerens	It is the prime minister's

=== Adjectives ===
Norwegian adjectives, like those of Swedish and Danish, inflect for definiteness, gender, number and for comparison (affirmative/comparative/superlative). Inflection for definiteness follows two paradigms, called "weak" and "strong", a feature shared among the Germanic languages.

The following table summarizes the inflection of adjectives in Norwegian. The indefinite affirmative inflection can vary between adjectives, but in general the paradigm illustrated below is the most common.

Inflection patterns for adjectives in Norwegian
	Affirmative				Comparative	Superlative	
	Indefinite			Definite	Comparative	Superlative	
	Common	Neuter	Plural	Definite	Comparative	Indefinite	Definite
Bokmål	-	-t	-e		-ere	-est	-este
Nynorsk	-	-t	-e		-are	-ast	-aste

Predicate adjectives follow only the indefinite inflection table. Unlike attributive adjectives, they are not inflected for definiteness.

Adjective forms, examples: grønn/grøn ('green'), pen ('pretty'), stjålet/stolen ('stolen')
	Affirmative				Comparative	Superlative	
	Indefinite			Definite	Comparative	Superlative	
	Common	Neuter	Plural	Definite	Comparative	Indefinite	Definite
Bokmål	grønn	grønt	grønne		grønnere	grønnest	grønneste
Nynorsk	grøn	grønt	grøne		grønare	grønast	grønaste
English	green				greener	greenest	
Bokmål	pen	pent	pene		penere	penest	peneste
Nynorsk	pen	pent	pene		penare	penast	penaste
English	pretty				prettier	prettiest	
Bokmål	stjålet/stjålen	stjålet	stjålne				
Nynorsk	stolen	stole	stolne		–	–	
English	stolen				–	–	

In most dialects, some verb participles used as adjectives have a separate form in both definite and plural uses, and sometimes also in the masculine-feminine singular. In some Southwestern dialects, the definite adjective is also declined in gender and number with one form for feminine and plural, and one form for masculine and neuter.

==== Attributive adjectives ====
===== Definite inflection =====
In Norwegian, a definite noun has a suffixed definite article (cf. above) compared to English which in general uses the separate word the to indicate the same. However, when a definite noun is preceded by an adjective, the adjective also gets a definite inflection, shown in the inflection table above. There is also another definite marker, den, that has to agree in gender with the noun when the definite noun is accompanied by an adjective. It comes before the adjective and has the following forms

Determinative den (Bokmål)
Masculine	Feminine	Neuter	Plural
Den	Den	Det	De

Examples of definite affirmative inflection of adjectives (Bokmål):

- Den stjålne bilen ('The stolen car')
- Den pene jenta ('The pretty girl')
- Det grønne eplet ('The green apple')
- De stjålne bilene ('The stolen cars')

If the adjective is dropped completely, the meaning of the preceding article before the noun changes, as shown in this example.

Examples (Bokmål):

- Den bilen ('That car')
- Den jenta ('That girl')
- Det eplet ('That apple')
- De bilene ('Those cars')

Examples of definite comparative and superlative inflection of adjectives (Bokmål):

- Det grønnere eplet ('The greener apple')
- Det grønneste eplet ('The greenest apple')

Definiteness is also signaled by using possessive pronouns or any uses of a noun in its genitive form in either Nynorsk or Bokmål: mitt grønne hus ('my green house'), min grønne bil ('my green car'), mitt tilbaketrukne tannkjøtt ('my receding gums'), presidentens gamle hus ('the president's old house').

===== Indefinite inflection =====
Examples (Bokmål):

- En grønn bil ('A green car')
- Ei pen jente ('A pretty girl')
- Et grønt eple ('A green apple')
- Flere grønne biler ('Many green cars')

Examples of comparative and superlative inflections in Bokmål: en grønnere bil ('a greener car'), grønnest bil ('greenest car').

==== Predicative adjectives ====
There is also predicative agreement of adjectives in all dialects of Norwegian and in the written languages, unlike related languages like German and Dutch. This feature of predicative agreement is shared among the Scandinavian languages. Predicative adjectives do not inflect for definiteness unlike the attributive adjectives.

This means that nouns will have to agree with the adjective when there is a copula verb involved, like in Bokmål: være ('to be'), bli ('become'), ser ut ('looks like'), kjennes ('feels like') etc.

Adjective agreement, examples
	Norwegian (bokmål)	English
Masculine	Bilen var grønn	The car was green
Feminine	Døra er grønn	The door is green
Neuter	Flagget er grønt	The flag is green
Plural	Blåbærene blir store	The blueberries will be big

=== Verbs ===
Norwegian verbs are not conjugated for person or number, unlike English and most European languages, though a few Norwegian dialects do conjugate for number. Norwegian verbs are conjugated according to mainly three grammatical moods: indicative, imperative and subjunctive, though the subjunctive mood has largely fallen out of use and is mainly found in a few common frozen expressions. The imperative is formed by removing the last vowel of the infinitive verb form, just like in the other Scandinavian languages.

Indicative verbs are conjugated for tense: present, past, and future. The present and past tense also have a passive form for the infinitive.

There are four non-finite verb forms: infinitive, passive infinitive, and the two participles: perfective/past participle and imperfective/present participle.

The participles are verbal adjectives. The imperfective participle is not declined, whereas the perfect participle is declined for gender (though not in Bokmål) and number like strong, affirmative adjectives. The definite form of the participle is identical to the plural form.

As with other Germanic languages, Norwegian verbs can be divided into two conjugation classes; weak verbs and strong verbs.

Verb forms in Nynorsk leva ('to live') and finna ('to find')
	Finite				Non-finite					
	Indicative		Subjunctive	Imperative	Verbal nouns	Verbal adjectives (Participles)				
	Present	Past	Subjunctive	Imperative	Infinitive	Imperfective	Perfective			
	Present	Past	Subjunctive	Imperative	Infinitive	Imperfective	Masculine	Feminine	Neuter	Plural/Def
Active	lever	levde	leve	lev	leva	levande	levd		levt	levde
Active	finn	fann		finn	finna	(har) funne	funnen		funne	
Passive	levest	levdest			levast					
Passive	finst	fanst			finnast	(har) funnest				

Verb forms in Bokmål å leve ('to live') and å finne ('to find')
	Finite				Non-finite			
	Indicative		Subjunctive	Imperative	Verbal nouns	Verbal adjectives (Participles)		
	Present	Past	Subjunctive	Imperative	Infinitive	Imperfective	Perfective	
	Present	Past	Subjunctive	Imperative	Infinitive	Imperfective	Singular	Plural/Def
Active	lever	levde/levet	leve	lev	leve	levende	levd	levde/levet
Active	finner	fant		finn	finne	(har) funnet	funnet	funne
Passive	leves	levdes			leves			
Passive	fins/finnes	fantes			finnes	(har funnes)		

==== Ergative verbs ====
There are ergative verbs in both Bokmål and Nynorsk, where there are two different conjugation patterns depending on if the verb takes an object or not. In Bokmål, there are only two different conjugations for the preterite tense for the strong verbs, while Nynorsk has different conjugations for all tenses, like Swedish and a majority of Norwegian dialects. Some weak verbs are also ergative and are differentiated for all tenses in both Bokmål and Nynorsk, like ligge/legge, both of which meaning 'to lie down', but ligge does not take an object while legge requires an object. Legge corresponds to the English verb 'lay', while ligge corresponds to the English verb 'lie'. There are, however, many verbs that do not have a direct translation to English verbs.

Ergative verb knekke ('crack')
Norwegian Bokmål	English
Nøtta knakk	The nut cracked
Jeg knekte nøtta	I cracked the nut
Jeg ligger	I'm lying down
Jeg legger det ned	I'll lay it down

=== Pronouns ===
Norwegian personal pronouns are declined according to case: nominative and accusative. Like English, pronouns in Bokmål and Nynorsk are the only class that has case declension. Some of the dialects that have preserved the dative in nouns, also have a dative case instead of the accusative case in personal pronouns, while others have accusative in pronouns and dative in nouns, effectively giving these dialects three distinct cases.

In the most comprehensive Norwegian grammar, Norsk referansegrammatikk, the categorization of personal pronouns by person, gender, and number is not regarded as inflection. Pronouns are a closed class in Norwegian.

Since December 2017, the gender-neutral pronoun hen is present in the Norwegian Academy's dictionary (NAOB). In June 2022, the Language Council of Norway (Språkrådet) started including hen in both Bokmål and Nynorsk Norwegian standards.

Pronouns in Bokmål
			Subject form	Object form	Possessive			
			Subject form	Object form	Singular			Plural
			Subject form	Object form	Male	Female	Neuter	Plural
Singular	1st person		jeg	meg	min	mi	mitt	mine
Singular	2nd person		du	deg	din	di	ditt	dine
Singular	3rd person	Male, animate	han	ham/han	hans			
Singular	3rd person	Female, animate	hun	henne	hennes			
Singular	3rd person	Neuter, animate	hen	hen	hens			
Singular	3rd person	Male/female, inanimate	den		dens			
Singular	3rd person	Neuter, inanimate	det		dets			
Singular	3rd person	Reflexive	–	seg	sin	si	sitt	sine
Plural	1st person		vi	oss	vår		vårt	våre
Plural	2nd person		dere		deres			
Plural	3rd person	Non-reflexive	de	dem	deres			
Plural	3rd person	Reflexive	–	seg	sin	si	sitt	sine

Pronouns in Nynorsk
			Subject form	Object form	Possessive			
			Subject form	Object form	Singular			Plural
			Subject form	Object form	Male	Female	Neuter	Plural
Singular	1st person		eg	meg	min	mi	mitt	mine
Singular	2nd person		du	deg	din	di	ditt	dine
Singular	3rd person	Male	han	han	hans			
Singular	3rd person	Female	ho	ho	hennar			
Singular	3rd person	Neuter, animate	hen	hen	hens			
Singular	3rd person	Neuter, inanimate	det	det	(dess)			
Singular	3rd person	Reflexive	–	seg	sin	si	sitt	sine
Plural	1st person		vi/me	oss	vår		vårt	våre
Plural	2nd person		de/dokker	dykk/dokker	dykkar/dokkar			
Plural	3rd person	Non-reflexive	dei		deira			
Plural	3rd person	Reflexive	–	seg	sin	si	sitt	sine

The words for 'mine', 'yours' etc. are dependent on the gender of the noun described. Like adjectives, they have to agree in gender with the noun.

Bokmål has two sets of third-person pronouns. Han and hun refer to male and female individuals respectively; den and det refer to impersonal or inanimate nouns, of masculine/feminine or neutral gender respectively. In contrast, Nynorsk and most dialects use the same set of pronouns han ('he'), ho ('she') and det ('it') for both personal and impersonal references, like in German, Icelandic and Old Norse. Det also has expletive and cataphoric uses like in the English examples it rains and it was known by everyone (that) he had travelled the world.

Examples in Nynorsk and Bokmål of the use of the pronoun it
Nynorsk	Bokmål	English
Kor er boka mi? Ho er her	Hvor er boka mi? Den er her	Where is my book? It is here
Kor er bilen min? Han er her	Hvor er bilen min? Den er her	Where is my car? It is here
Kor er brevet mitt? Det er her	Hvor er brevet mitt? Det er her	Where is my letter? It is here

==== Ordering of possessive pronouns ====
The ordering of possessive pronouns is somewhat freer than in Swedish or Danish. When there is no adjective, the most common word order is the one used in the examples in the table above, where the possessive comes after the noun, while the noun is in its definite form; boka mi ('my book'). If one wishes to emphasize the owner of the noun, the possessive pronoun will usually be placed first. In Bokmål, however, due to its Danish origins, one could choose to always write the possessive first: min bil ('my car'), but this may sound very formal. Some dialects that have been very influenced by Danish also do this; some speakers in Bærum and the west of Oslo may always use this word order. When there is an adjective describing the noun, the possessive pronoun will always come first: min egen bil ('my own car').

Norwegian (Bokmål/Nynorsk)	English
Det er mi bok!	It is my book! (owner emphasized)
Kona mi er vakker	My wife is beautiful

=== Determiners ===
The closed class of Norwegian determiners are declined in gender and number in agreement with their argument. Not all determiners are inflected.

Determiner forms egen (own) in Bokmål
Masculine	Feminine	Neuter	Plural
egen/eigen	egen/eiga	eget/eige	egne/eigne

Determiner forms eigen (own) in Nynorsk
Masculine	Feminine	Neuter	Plural
eigen	eiga	eige	eigne

=== Numerals ===
Cardinal and ordinal number words in Bokmål and Nynorsk
	Cardinal numeral		Ordinal numeral	
	Bokmål	Nynorsk	Bokmål	Nynorsk
0	null		nulte	
1	én (m.), éi (f.), ett (n.)	éin (m.), éi (f.), eitt (n.)	første	første/ fyrste
2	to		annen (m./def.), anna (f.), annet (n.), andre (pl.)/ andre (all genres/def./pl.)	annan (m.), anna (f./n.), andre (def./pl.)
3	tre		tredje	
4	fire		fjerde	
5	fem		femte	
6	seks		sjette	
7	sju/ syv	sju	sjuende/ syvende	sjuande
8	åtte		åttende	åttande
9	ni		niende	niande
10	ti		tiende	tiande
11	elleve		ellevte	
12	tolv		tolvte	
13	tretten		trettende	trettande
14	fjorten		fjortende	fjortande
15	femten		femtende	femtande
16	seksten		sekstende	sekstande
17	sytten		syttende	syttande
18	atten		attende	attande
19	nitten		nittende	nittande
20	tjue		tjuende	tjuande
21	tjueen	tjueein	tjueførste	tjueførste/ tjuefyrste
30	tretti		trettiende	trettiande
40	førti		førtiende	førtiande
50	femti		femtiende	femtiande
60	seksti		sekstiende	sekstiande
70	sytti		syttiende	syttiande
80	åtti		åttiende	åttiande
90	nitti		nittiende	nittiande
100	(ett) hundre	(eitt) hundre	(ett) hundrede	(eitt) hundrede
1000	(ett) tusen	(eitt) tusen	(ett) tusende	(eitt) tusende

=== Particle classes ===
Norwegian has five closed classes without inflection, i.e. lexical categories with grammatical function and a finite number of members that may not be distinguished by morphological criteria. These are interjections, conjunctions, subjunctions, prepositions, and adverbs. The inclusion of adverbs here requires that traditional adverbs that are inflected in comparison be classified as adjectives, as is sometimes done.

==== Adverbs ====
Adverbs can be formed from adjectives in Norwegian. English usually creates adverbs from adjectives by the suffix -ly, like the adverb beautifully from the adjective beautiful. By comparison, Scandinavian languages usually form adverbs from adjectives by the grammatical neuter singular form of the adjective. This is in general true for both Bokmål and Nynorsk.

Example (Bokmål):

- Han er grusom ('He is terrible')
- Det er grusomt ('It is terrible')
- Han er grusomt treig ('He is terribly slow')

In the third sentence, grusomt is an adverb. In the first and second sentence grusomt and grusom are adjectives and must agree in grammatical gender with the noun.

Another example is the adjective vakker ('beautiful') which exists in both Nynorsk and Bokmål and has the neuter singular form vakkert.

Example (Nynorsk):

- Ho er vakker ('She is beautiful')
- Det er vakkert ('It is beautiful')
- Ho syng vakkert ('She sings beautifully')

=== Compound words ===
In Norwegian compound words, the head, i.e. the part determining the compound's class, is the last part. If the compound word is constructed from many different nouns, the last noun in the compound noun will determine the gender of the compound noun. Only the first part has primary stress. For instance, the compound tenketank ('think tank') has primary stress on the first syllable and is a masculine noun since the noun tank is masculine.

Compound words are written together in Norwegian, which can cause words to become very long, for example sannsynlighetsmaksimeringsestimator ('maximum likelihood estimator') and menneskerettighetsorganisasjoner ('human rights organizations'). Other examples are the title høyesterettsjustitiarius ('Chief Justice of the Supreme Court', originally a combination of supreme court and the actual title, justiciar) and the translation En midtsommernattsdrøm for A Midsummer Night's Dream.

If they are not written together, each part is naturally read with primary stress, and the meaning of the compound is lost. Examples of this in English are the difference between a green house and a greenhouse or a black board and a blackboard.

This is sometimes forgotten, occasionally with humorous results. Instead of writing, for example, lammekoteletter ('lamb chops'), people make the mistake of writing lamme koteletter ('lame', or 'paralyzed', 'chops'). The original message can even be reversed, as when røykfritt (lit. 'smoke-free', meaning no smoking) becomes røyk fritt ('smoke freely').

Other examples include:

- Terrasse dør ('Terrace dies') instead of Terrassedør ('Terrace door')
- Tunfisk biter ('Tuna bites', verb) instead of Tunfiskbiter ('Tuna bits', noun)
- Smult ringer ('Lard calls', verb) instead of Smultringer ('Doughnuts')
- Tyveri sikret ('Theft guaranteed') instead of Tyverisikret ('Theft-proof')
- Stekt kylling lever ('Fried chicken lives', verb) instead of Stekt kyllinglever ('Fried chicken liver', noun)
- Smør brød (lit. 'Smear bread', verb) instead of Smørbrød ('Sandwich'). In practice "Smør brød" can be understood as an imperative, ordering someone to 'Make sandwich!'
- Klipp fisk ('Cut fish', verb) instead of Klippfisk ('Clipfish')
- På hytte taket ('On cottage the roof') instead of På hyttetaket ('On the cottage roof')
- Altfor Norge ('Too Norway') instead of Alt for Norge ('Everything for Norway', the royal motto of Norway)

These misunderstandings occur because most nouns can be interpreted as verbs or other types of words. Similar misunderstandings can be achieved in English too. The following are examples of phrases that both in Norwegian and English mean one thing as a compound word, and something different when regarded as separate words:

- stavekontroll ('spellchecker') or stave kontroll ('spell checker')
- kokebok ('cookbook') or koke bok ('cook book')
- ekte håndlagde vafler ('real handmade waffles') or ekte hånd lagde vafler ('real hand made waffles')

=== Syntax ===
==== Word order ====
Norwegian syntax is predominantly SVO. The subject occupies the sentence-initial position, followed by the verb and then the object. Like many other Germanic languages, it follows the V2 rule, which means that the finite verb is invariably the second element in a sentence. For example:

- Jeg spiser fisk i dag ('I eat fish today')
- Jeg vil drikke kaffe i dag ('I want to drink coffee today')

Exceptions to the rule are embedded clauses and question phrases.

===== Negation =====
Negation in Norwegian is expressed by the word ikke, which literally means 'not' and is placed after the finite verb. Exceptions are embedded clauses.

- Hunden kom ikke tilbake med ballen. ('The dog did not return with the ball.')
- Det var hunden som ikke kom tilbake. ('It was the dog that did not return.')

Contractions with the negation, as is accepted in for example English (cannot, hadn't, didn't) are limited to dialects and colloquial speech. In this case contractions apply to the negation and the verb. Otherwise ikke is applied in similar ways as the English not and general negation.

===== Adverbs =====
Adverbs follow the verb they modify. Depending on the type of adverb, the order in which they appear in the phrase is pre-determined. Manner adverbs for example, precede temporal adverbs. Switching the order of these adverbs would not render the phrase ungrammatical, but would make it sound awkward. Compare this to the English phrase "John probably already ate dinner." Switching the adverbs' position (already and probably) to "John already probably ate dinner" is not incorrect, but sounds unnatural. For more information, see Cartographic syntax.

- Hun sang rørende vakkert. ('She sang touchingly beautiful.')
- Hun sang utrolig høyt. ('She sang unbelievably loud.')

The adverb may precede the verb when the focus of the sentence is shifted. If special attention should be directed on the temporal aspect of the sentence, the adverb can be fronted. Since the V2 rule requires the finite verb to syntactically occupy the second position in the clause, the verb consequently also moves in front of the subject.

- I dag vil jeg drikke kaffe. ('Today, I want to drink coffee.')
- I dag spiser jeg fisk. ('Today, I eat fish.')

Only one adverb may precede the verb, unless it belongs to a bigger constituent, in which case it does not modify the main verb in the phrase, but is part of the constituent.

- Hun spiste suppen raskt i går. ('She ate the soup quickly yesterday.')
- I går spiste hun suppen raskt. ('Yesterday she ate the soup quickly.')
- Laget som spilte best, hadde forlatt plassen. ('The team that played the best had left the pitch.')

===== Adjectives =====
Attributive adjectives always precede the noun that they modify.

- De tre store tjukke tunge røde bøkene stod i hylla. ('The three big fat heavy red books stood on the shelf.')
- Den andre heldigvis lange tynne nøkkelen passet. ('The other fortunately long thin key fit'.)

== Example text ==
Norwegian pronunciation (Bokmål)

Norwegian pronunciation (Nynorsk)

Article 1 of the Universal Declaration of Human Rights in Norwegian Bokmål:

Alle mennesker er født frie og med samme menneskeverd og menneskerettigheter. De er utstyrt med fornuft og samvittighet og bør handle mot hverandre i brorskapets ånd.

Article 1 of the Universal Declaration of Human Rights in Norwegian Nynorsk:

Alle menneske er fødde til fridom og med same menneskeverd og menneskerettar. Dei har fått fornuft og samvit og skal leve med kvarandre som brør.

Article 1 of the Universal Declaration of Human Rights in English:

All human beings are born free and equal in dignity and rights. They are endowed with reason and conscience and should act towards one another in a spirit of brotherhood.

== See also ==
- Norwegian Academy
- Comparison of Danish, Norwegian and Swedish
- Noregs Mållag
- Norsk Ordbok
- Riksmålsforbundet
- Russenorsk
- Tone (linguistics)

== Bibliography ==
- Olav T. Beito, Nynorsk grammatikk. Lyd- og ordlære, Det Norske Samlaget, Oslo 1986, ISBN 82-521-2801-7
- Rolf Theil Endresen, Hanne Gram Simonsen, Andreas Sveen, Innføring i lingvistikk (2002), ISBN 82-00-45273-5
- Jan Terje Faarlund, Svein Lie, Kjell Ivar Vannebo, Norsk referansegrammatikk, Universitetsforlaget, Oslo 1997, 2002 (3rd edition), ISBN 82-00-22569-0 (Bokmål and Nynorsk)
- Philip Holmes, Hans-Olav Enger, Norwegian: A Comprehensive Grammar, Routledge, Abingdon, 2018, ISBN 978-0-415-83136-9
- The Norwegian Language Council (1994), Language usage in Norway's civil service, in English
- Damion Searls. "The Other Norwegian". Granta 175, 30th June 2026.
- Arne Torp, Lars S. Vikør (1993), Hovuddrag i norsk språkhistorie (3.utgåve), Gyldendal Norsk Forlag AS 2003
- Lars S. Vikør (2015), Norwegian: Bokmål vs. Nynorsk, on Språkrådet's website
