= Middle Norwegian =

Form of Norwegian language (1350–1550)

- nornskt mál
- Region: Kingdom of Norway (872–1397), Kalmar Union, Denmark–Norway
- Era: 14th–16th century
- Language family: Indo-European: Germanic; North Germanic; West Scandinavian; Norwegian; Middle Norwegian
- Early forms: Proto-Germanic: Proto-Norse; Old Norse; Old West Norse; Old Norwegian
- Writing system: Latin

Language codes
- ISO 639-3: None (mis)
- Glottolog: None

Middle Norwegian (Norwegian Bokmål: mellomnorsk; Norwegian Nynorsk: mellomnorsk, millomnorsk) is a form of the Norwegian language that was spoken from 1350 up to 1550 and was the last phase of Norwegian in its original state, before Danish replaced Norwegian as the official written language in Norway.

== Language history ==
The Black Death came to Norway in 1349, killing over 60% of the population. This significantly affected the development of Norwegian down the line.

The language in Norway after 1350 until about 1550 is generally referred to as Middle Norwegian. During this period the language went through several changes: morphological paradigms were simplified, including the loss of grammatical cases and the levelling of personal inflection on verbs. An epenthetic "e" gradually appeared before the nominative -r ending from Old Norse to ease pronunciation. This made terms such as hestr change to hester. The -r disappeared from the language altogether, and so did the epenthetic in most dialects, but some still retain this vowel. A vowel reduction also took place, in some dialects, including in parts of Norway, reducing many final unstressed vowels in a word to a common "e".

The phonemic inventory also underwent changes. The dental fricatives, represented by the letters þ and ð, disappeared from Norwegian, either by merging with their equivalent stop consonants, represented by t and d, respectively, or by being lost altogether.

=== Danicisation of the written language ===
During the 15th century, Middle Norwegian gradually ceased to be used as a written language. At the end of the 16th century, Christian IV of Denmark-Norway (1577–1648) decided to revise and translate Magnus VI of Norway's 13th century Landslov "Country Law" into Danish, since it was originally written in Old West Norse. In 1604, the revised version of the law was introduced. The translation of this law marks the final transition to Danish as the administrative language in Norway.
