= Old Norwegian =

Early form of Norwegian language

- norrǿnn mál
- Region: Kingdom of Norway (872–1397)
- Era: 11th–14th century
- Language family: Indo-European: Germanic; North Germanic; West Scandinavian; Norwegian; Old Norwegian
- Early forms: Proto-Indo-European: Proto-Germanic; Proto-Norse; Old Norse; Old West Norse
- Writing system: Medieval Runes, Latin

Language codes
- ISO 639-3: None (mis)
- Glottolog: None

Old Norwegian (Norwegian: gammelnorsk and gam(m)alnorsk), also called Norwegian Norse, is an early form of the Norwegian language that was spoken between the 11th and 14th century; it is a transitional stage between Old West Norse and Middle Norwegian.

Its distinction from Old West Norse is mostly a matter of convention, but it is also the period when the language began to develop its immense diversity. Old Norwegian is typically divided into the following dialect areas:

- Western Norway:
  - Trøndelag
  - Northwest Norway (Romsdal, Sunnmøre, Nordfjord and the coast of Sogn)
  - Southwest Norway:
    - Outer Southwest (Rogaland and Hordaland)
    - Inner Southwest (Agder, western Telemark, Setesdal, continental Sogn, Hordaland and Rogaland, including Iceland and the Faroe Islands)
- Eastern Norway:
  - Southeast Norway
  - East Norway Proper

No sources appear to exist from which the dialectal variation of the rest of Norway might be discerned. There do, however, seem to be reasons to believe the region of Oppland constituted its own dialect area, though it is unclear whether this would fall within the Western or Eastern dialect group, as well as that Greenlandic Old Norse had begun to develop its own linguistic variety.

== Phonological and morphological features ==
One of the most important early differences between Old Norwegian and Old Icelandic is that h in the consonant combinations hl-, hn- and hr- was lost in Old Norwegian around the 11th century, while being preserved in Old Icelandic. Thus, one has e.g. Old Icelandic hlíð 'slope', hníga 'curtsey' and hringr 'ring' and Old Norwegian líð, níga and ringr, respectively.

Many Old Norwegian dialects feature a height based system of vowel harmony: Following stressed high vowels (/i/, /iː/, /y/, /yː/, /u/, /uː/) and diphthongs (/ei/, /ey/, /au/), the unstressed vowels /i/ and /u/ appear as i, u, while they are represented as e, o following long non-high vowels (/eː/, /øː/, /oː/, /æː/, /aː/). The situation following stressed short non-high vowels (/e/, /æ/, /ø/, /a/, /o/, /ɔ/) is much debated and was apparently different in the individual dialects.

The u-umlaut of short /a/ (written ǫ in normalized Old Norse) is not as consistently graphically distinguished from non-umlauted /a/ as in Old Icelandic, especially in writings from the Eastern dialect areas. It is still a matter of academic debate whether this is to be interpreted phonologically as a lack of umlaut or merely as a lack of its graphical representation.

Old Norwegian had alternative dual and plural first person pronouns, mit, mér, to the Common Norse vit, vér.

== Old Norn ==
Norn is an extinct language derived from the North Germanic language family that died out in the late 19th or early 20th century. It was primarily spoken in the Northern Isles, or Orkney (Orkneyjar) and Shetland (Hjaltland), and Caithness on the northern tip of Scotland. Little remains of Norn other than a few literary works in Orkney Norn and Shetland Norn, while Caithness Norn is expected to have died out in the 15th century, replaced by Scots.

Sources from the 17th and 18th century report that Norn, often misidentified as Danish, Norse or Norwegian, was in a rapid decline, although prevailing in Shetland more than Orkney. Walter Sutherland is generally considered the last native speaker of the language, dying in 1850, though many claims describe the language, probably in verses and songs, spoken in the islands of Foula and Unst as late as the 20th century.

== Middle Norwegian ==
The Black Death struck Norway in 1349, killing over 60% of the population. This significantly affected the development of Norwegian down the line. The language in Norway after 1350 up to about 1550 is generally referred to as Middle Norwegian. The language went through several changes: morphological paradigms were simplified, including the loss of grammatical cases and the levelling of personal inflection on verbs. A vowel reduction also took place, in some dialects, including in parts of Norway, reducing many final unstressed vowels in a word to a common "e".

The phonemic inventory also underwent changes. The dental fricatives represented by the letters þ and ð disappeared from the Norwegian language, either merging with their equivalent stop consonants, represented by t and d, respectively, or being lost altogether.

== See also ==
- Norwegian language
- Icelandic language
- Faroese language
- Norn language
