= Languages of Sweden =

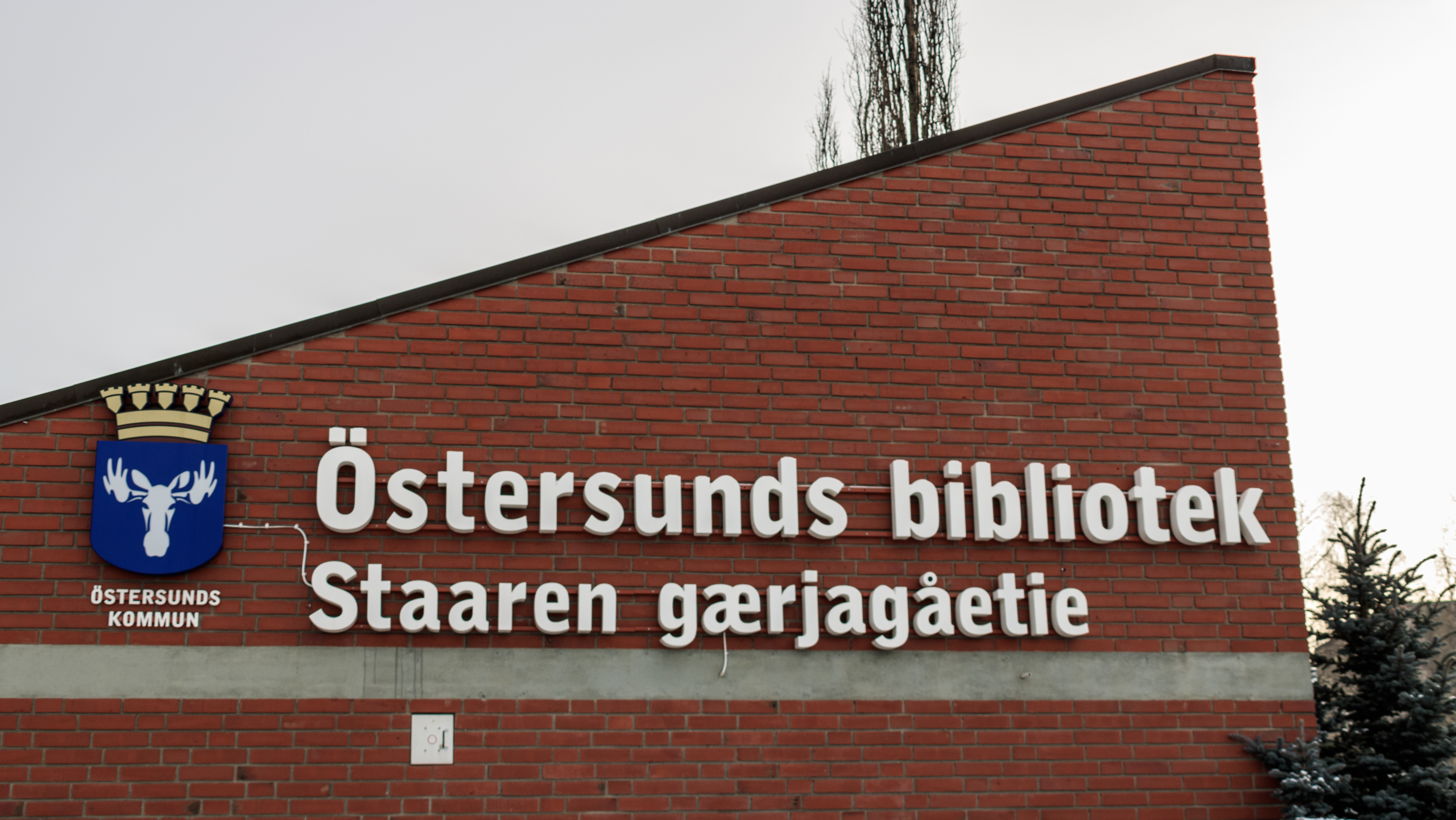
- Sign at a library in Swedish and Southern Sami
- Official: Swedish (since 2009)
- Recognised: Swedish (until 2009)
- Regional: Swedish dialects (including South Swedish, Götamål, Svealand, Norrland), Dalecarlian, Gutnish
- Minority: (Officially recognised) Finnish, Meänkieli, Romani, Sámi, Yiddish
- Immigrant: Arabic, Serbo-Croatian, Greek, Kurdish, Persian, Polish, Spanish, Somali
- Foreign: English (89%); German (30%); French (11%)
- Signed: Swedish Sign Language
- Keyboard layout: Swedish QWERTY for Windows
- Source: Europeans and their Languages (published in 2006, archived from europa.eu)

Swedish is the official language of Sweden and is spoken by the vast majority of the 10.60 million inhabitants of the country. It is a North Germanic language and quite similar to its sister Scandinavian languages, Danish and Norwegian, with which it maintains partial mutual intelligibility and forms a dialect continuum. A number of regional Swedish dialects are spoken across the country. In total, more than 200 languages are estimated to be spoken across the country, including regional languages, indigenous Sámi languages, and immigrant languages.

In 2009, the Riksdag passed a national language law recognizing Swedish as the main and common language of society, as well as the official language for "international contexts". The law also confirmed the official status of the five national minority languages — Finnish, Meänkieli, Romani, Sámi languages and Yiddish — and Swedish Sign Language.

== History ==
For several centuries, Sweden was a larger country than today. At its height in 1658, the Swedish Empire spread across what is currently Finland and Estonia and into parts of Poland, Russia, Latvia, Germany, Denmark, and Norway. Hence, Sweden's linguistic landscape has historically been very different from its current context.

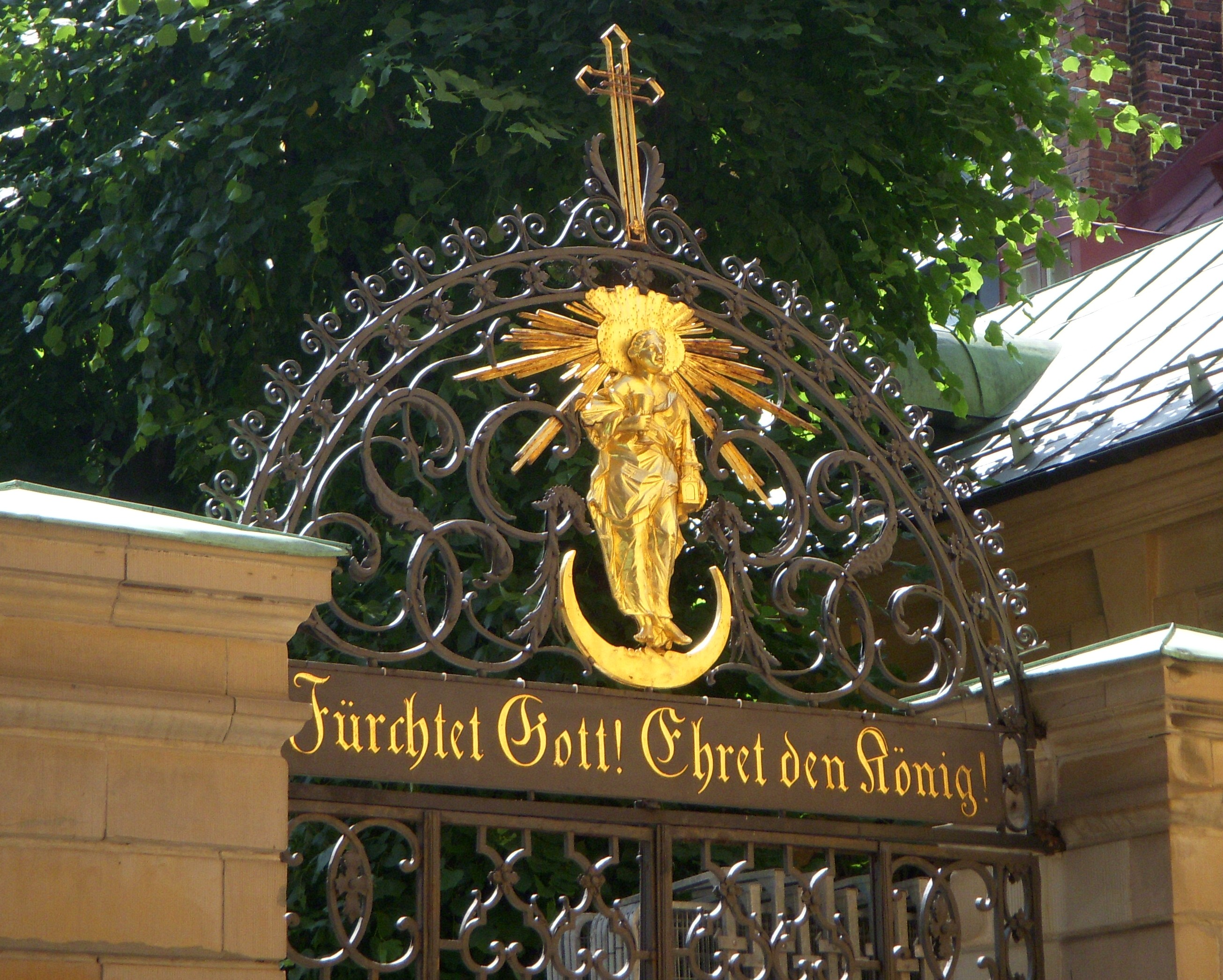
Sign in German outside the German Church, Stockholm

Swedish evolved from Old Norse around the 14th and 15th century. Swedish dialects were generally much more diverse in the past than they are today. Since the 20th century, Standard Swedish has prevailed throughout the country. The Scandinavian languages can be considered to constitute a dialectal continuum and some of the traditional Swedish dialects such as (Jämtlandic) are similar to Norwegian dialects.

Finnish was the majority language of Sweden's eastern parts, though it was almost exclusively a spoken language. Parts of Finland are also home to a significant Swedish-speaking minority, including Åland, many of whom speak the Finland Swedish dialect. Finnish became a minority language in western Sweden as many Finnish speakers migrated there for economic reasons.

Estonian was the language of the majority in Swedish Estonia but the province, like Finland, hosted a Swedish-speaking minority and a more significant minority of Germans.

In medieval Sweden, the Low German language played an important role as a commercial language, serving as the lingua franca of the Hanseatic league. As such, Low German influenced Swedish and other languages in the region considerably. In medieval Stockholm, half the population were Low German speakers. Low German was also spoken in the 17th-century Swedish territories along the southern Baltic Coast in Swedish Pomerania, Bremen-Verden, Wismar and Wildeshausen, as well as by the Baltic Germans in Estonia and Swedish Livonia. Livonia was also inhabited by Latvians, Estonians and Livonians.

In Swedish Ingria, Finnish, Ingrian and Votian were spoken along with Swedish.

Latin, as the language of the Catholic Church, was introduced to Sweden with the Christianization of Sweden, around AD 1000. As in most of Europe, Latin remained the lingua franca and scholarly language of the educated communities for centuries in Sweden. For instance, Carl Linnaeus's most famous work, Systema Naturae, published in 1735, was written in Latin.

During the 18th century, French was the second language of Europe's upper classes and Sweden was no exception. The Swedish aristocracy often spoke French among themselves and code-switching between French and Swedish was common. The Swedish King Gustav III was a true Francophile and French was the common language at his court. In 1786, Gustav III founded the Swedish Academy to promote and advance the Swedish language and literature.

Aside from what is currently Norway, Sweden largely obtained its current borders in 1809, when it lost its eastern part (Finland) to the Russian Empire. Sweden largely lost its overseas possessions over time, with Swedish Pomerania being ceded to Denmark in exchange for Norway and Guadeloupe was returned to France in 1814. As a consequence, Sweden became a rather homogeneous country with the exceptions of the indigenous Sámi people and the Finnish-speaking Tornedalians in the northernmost parts of the country.

During the 19th century, Sweden became more industrialised, resulting in important demographic changes. The population doubled and people moved from the countryside to towns and cities. As a consequence of this and factors such as generalised education and mass media, traditional dialects began to make room for the standard language (Standard Swedish). During the same period and until the 1970s, Sweden applied a Swedification policy that limited schooling to Swedish-language instruction and actively discouraged the use of other languages.

As in the rest of Europe and much of the world, English has grown as an important foreign language in Sweden, especially since the Allied victory in World War II. During the second half of the 20th century and the first decade of the 21st century, Sweden has received great numbers of immigrants who speak languages other than Swedish (see: "Immigrant languages" below). It is unclear to what degree these communities will hold on to their languages and to what degree they will assimilate.

In 2009, the Riksdag passed the Language Law (Språklag SFS 2009:600), which contains provisions concerning the Swedish language, the five national minority languages and Swedish Sign Language. Among its provisions is a general mandate to safeguard the Swedish language, linguistic diversity in Sweden, and individuals' access to language.

== Swedish ==
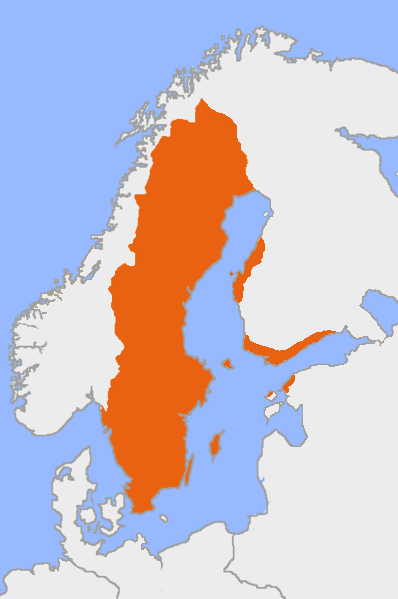
Map showing the Swedish-speaking areas of Scandinavia and Finland

The Kingdom of Sweden is a nation-state for the Swedish people and as such the national language is held in high regard. Of Sweden's roughly 10.5 million people, almost all speak Swedish, with the overwhelming majority of people in Sweden identifying Swedish as their first language (9.5 million, according to SIL's Ethnologue). Swedish is also an official language in Finland where it is spoken by a large number of Swedish-speaking Finns. The language is also spoken to some degree by ethnic Swedes living outside Sweden; for example, 48,500 people of Swedish descent in the United States speak the language, according to Ethnologue.

The Language Law of 2009 recognizes Swedish as the main and common language of society, as well as being the official language in "international contexts".

=== Dialects ===
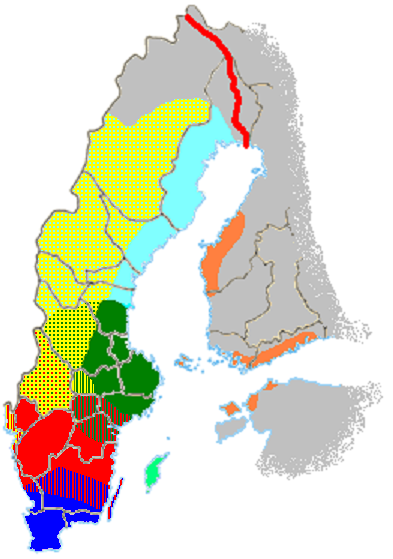
Map showing the Swedish dialects traditionally spoken. Stripes indicate transitional areas. South Swedish Götamål Svealand Swedish Norrland Finland Swedish Gutnish Norwegian Dialectal Influence

A number of Swedish dialects exist and are generally classified into six groups, called sockenmål in Swedish: South Swedish, Götamål, Svealand Swedish, Norrland, Eastern Swedish, and Gotlandic. As a North Germanic language, the Swedish dialects all grew out of Old Norse, but under differing influences as the language split along East and West Scandinavian branches. In western Sweden, many local dialects, such as Jämtlandic, show greater influence from the West Scandinavian branch of Old Norse and Norwegian.

==== Jämtlandic ====
Spoken mainly in Jämtland, but with a scattered speaker population throughout the rest of Sweden, Jämtlandic (Jämska) is a West Scandinavian language and part of the Norrland sockenmål with 95% lexical similarity to Norwegian and Swedish, but is generally more archaic. It has a native speaker population of 30,000.

==== Scanian ====
Spoken in the Swedish province of Scania, Scanian is today generally considered by Swedish linguists to be part of the South Swedish dialect group. It was historically considered by some a dialect of Danish.

== Recognised minority languages ==
In 1999, the Minority Language Committee of Sweden formally declared five languages as official minority languages of Sweden: Finnish, Meänkieli (also known as Tornedal, Tornionlaaksonsuomi or Tornedalian), Romani, Sámi languages (in particular Lule, Northern, and Southern Sámi), and Yiddish. The Language Law of 2009 confirms the recognition of these five languages as "national minority languages". This status enshrines the right of speakers of these languages to receive schooling and other services in their language.

=== Finnish ===
Areas with Finnish speaking population in per cent, in southern Sweden, 2005

As of 2009, there were about 470,000 Finnish-speakers in Sweden. Finnish, a Uralic language, has long been spoken in Sweden (the same holds true for Swedish in Finland, see Finland-Swedes, Åland), as Finland was part of the Swedish kingdom for centuries. Ethnic Finns (mainly first- and second-generation immigrants) constitute up to 5% of the population of Sweden. A high concentration of Finnish-speakers (some 16,000) resides in Norrbotten.

=== Meänkieli ===
Meänkieli is a Finnic language related to Finnish and Kven. Spoken by the Tornedalian people, it is mutually intelligible with northern dialects of Finnish, but has a higher number of Swedish loan words; it is sometimes considered a dialect of Finnish. Meänkieli is mainly used in the municipalities of Gällivare, Haparanda, Kiruna, Pajala and Övertorneå, all of which lie in the Torne Valley. Between 40,000 and 70,000 people speak Meänkieli as their first language.

=== Sámi languages ===
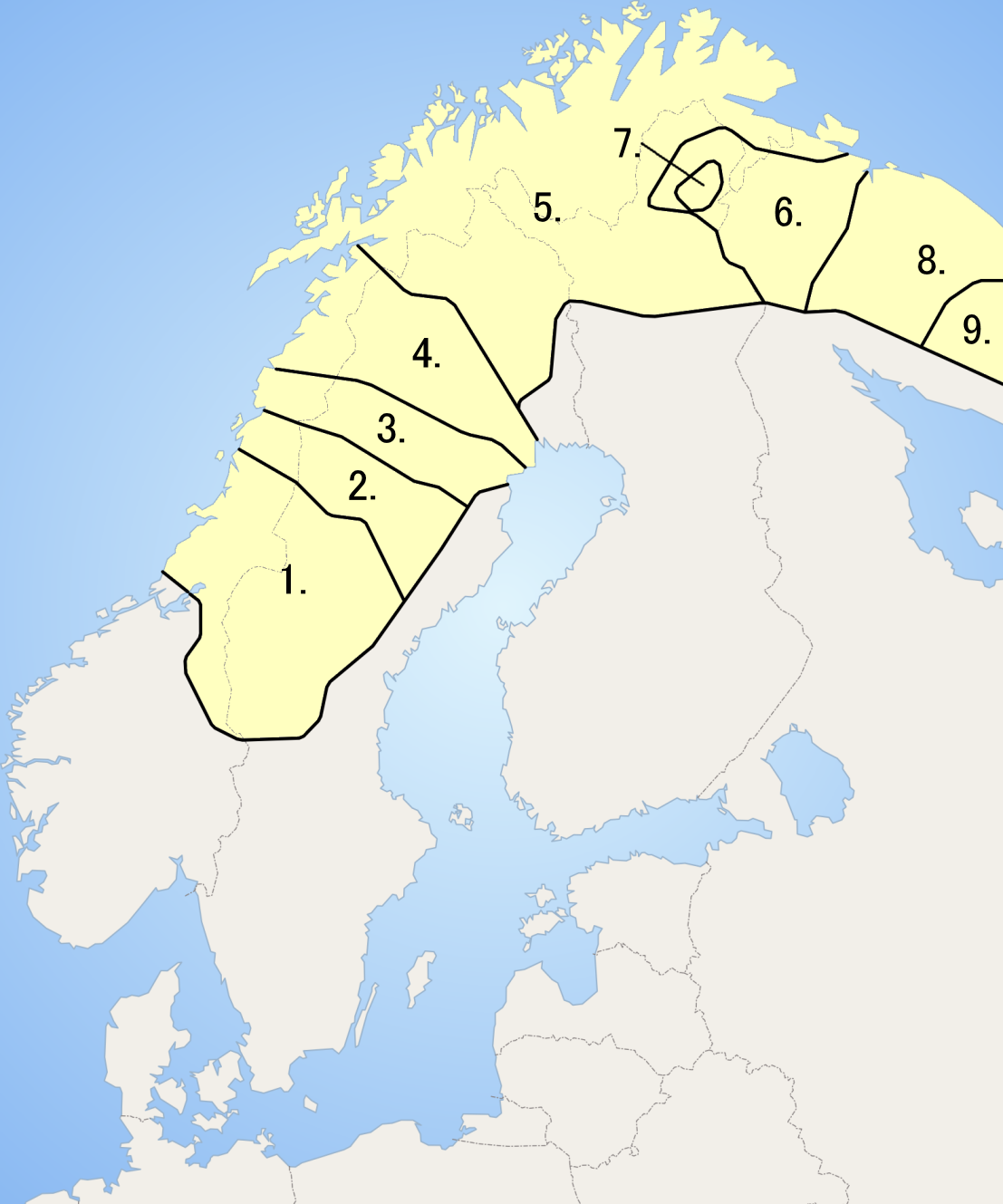
Map showing where Sámi languages are traditionally spoken

The Sámi people (formerly known as Lapps) are a people indigenous to Scandinavia and the Kola Peninsula (see Sápmi) who speak a related group of languages, five of which — Lule, Northern, and Southern Sámi, as well as the critically endangered Ume Sámi and Pite Sámi— are spoken in Sweden. Like Finnish and Meänkieli, Sámi languages are Uralic languages; however, prolonged exposure to Germanic-language-speaking neighbors in Sweden and Norway causes them to have a large number of Germanic loanwords not found in other Uralic languages. Between 15,000 and 20,000 Sámi people live in Sweden of whom 9,000 speak a Sámi language. In Sweden, the largest concentrations of Sámi-language speakers are found in the municipalities of Arjeplog, Gällivare, Jokkmokk, Kiruna, and other parts of Norrbotten.

=== Romani ===
Romani (also known as Rromani Ćhib) is a family of Indo-Aryan languages spoken by the Romani people, a nomadic ethnic group originating in northern India. Several dialects of Romani are spoken and Swedish, including the Scandoromani Para-Romani admixture of Scandinavian languages and Romani. Around 90% of Sweden's Romani people speak a form of Romani, meaning that there are approximately 9,500 ćhib speakers. In Sweden, there is no major geographic center for Romani, as there is for Finnish, Sámi, or Meänkieli, but it is considered to be of historical importance by the Swedish government and as such the government is seen as having an obligation to preserve them, a distinction also held by Yiddish. Because of this, the Swedish government has helped develop and publish a significant number of books and educational materials in Romani.

=== Yiddish ===
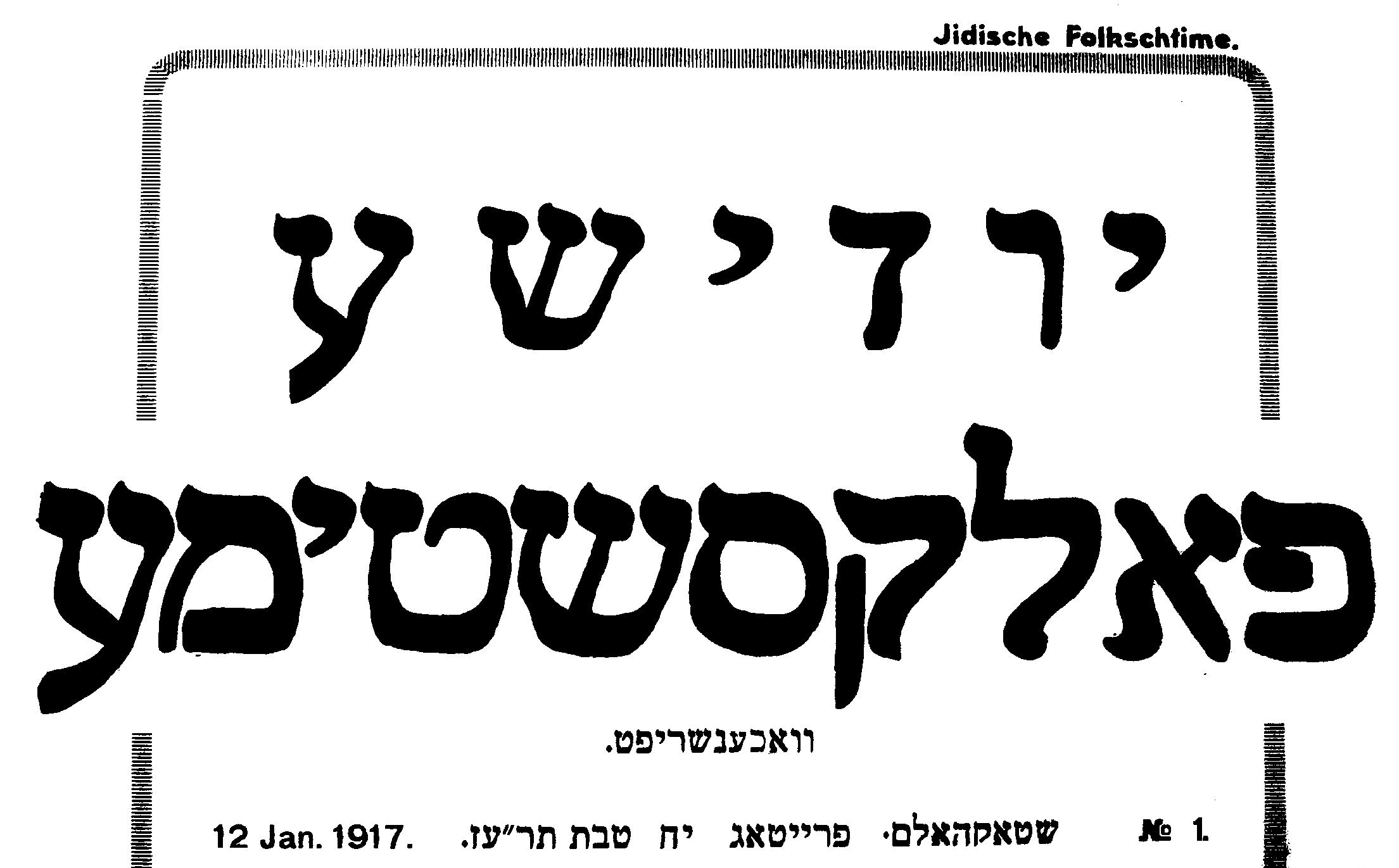
The first issue of Jidische Folkschtime (Yiddish People's Voice), a Yiddish-language newspaper first published in Stockholm, 12 January 1917

Yiddish is a Germanic language with significant Hebrew and Slavic influence, written with a variant of the Hebrew alphabet (see Yiddish orthography) and, formerly spoken by most Ashkenazic Jews (although most now speak the language of the country in which they live). Although the Jewish population of Sweden was traditionally Sephardic, after the 18th century, Ashkenazic immigration increased bringing with them the Yiddish language (See History of the Jews in Sweden). Like Romani, it is seen by the government as a language of historical importance. The organisation Sällskapet för Jiddisch och Jiddischkultur i Sverige (Society for Yiddish and Yiddish Culture in Sweden) has more than 200 members, many of whom are mother-tongue Yiddish speakers, and arranges regular activities for the speech community and in external advocacy for the Yiddish language.

As of 2009, the Jewish population in Sweden was estimated at 20,000, about 2,000–6,000 of whom claim to have at least some knowledge of Yiddish. The number of native speakers among these has been estimated by linguist Mikael Parkvall to be 750–1,500. It is believed that virtually all native speakers of Yiddish in Sweden today are adults, and most of them elderly.

=== Swedish Sign Language ===
Swedish Sign Language (SSL) is an officially recognized language and is used by the Deaf community in Sweden. SSL was developed in the early 1800s, possibly with some influence from British Sign Language. It has influenced the development of sign languages in Finland, Portugal, and Eritrea (see Swedish Sign Language family).

== Unrecognized minority languages ==
=== Dalecarlian ===
The Dalecarlian language varieties of Dalarna County vary significantly, ranging from the variations in the northwest of the county similar to the neighboring East Norwegian Østerdalsmål dialect to variations more similar to Swedish. Övdalian (or Elfdalian) is the largest of the Dalecarlian varieties, with about 1,500 speakers in Älvdalen Municipality. Dalecarlian has evolved separately from Old Norse and shows similarities with both the West and East Scandinavian branches of North Germanic.

=== Gutnish ===
Modern Gutnish exists as a spoken language in Gotland and Fårö. While influenced by Swedish, Gutnish is descended from Old Gutnish, which evolved as a separate branch of Old Norse.

== Foreign languages ==
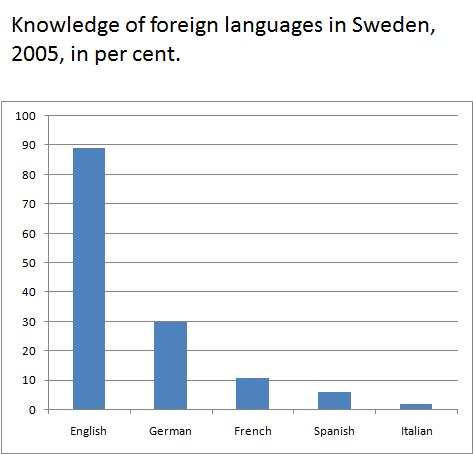
Knowledge of foreign languages in Sweden, as a percentage of the population aged 15 and above, 2005. Data taken from an EU survey ebs_243_en.pdf (europa.eu).

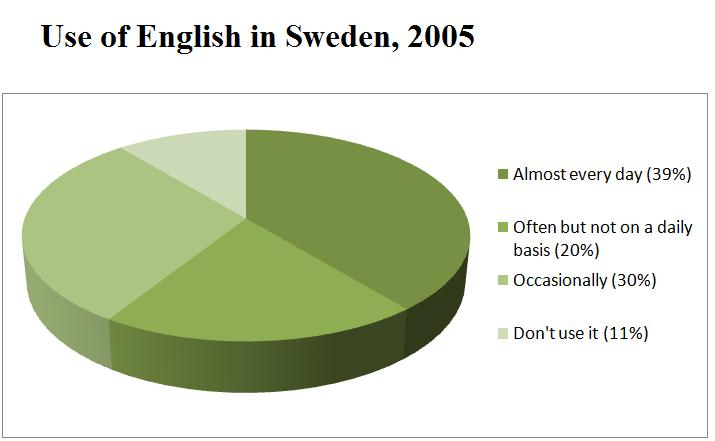
Frequency of use of the English language in Sweden, 2005, according to the Eurobarometer

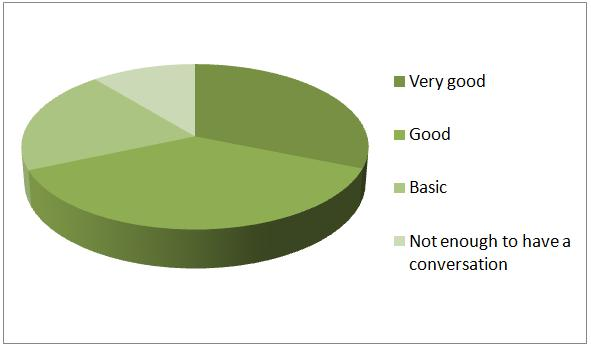
Self-reported knowledge of English in Sweden, 2005

Since the Middle Ages until the end of World War II, Germany was usually the country outside Scandinavia with the closest cultural, commercial and political relations with Sweden. Thus, study of the German language had always been promoted by the Swedish state as the primary foreign language. Many of Sweden's administrative and social institutions, including the education system, were organised along the German and Prussian model, as many Swedish pioneering intellectuals of the 17th century were educated in German universities. This changed after the end of the Second World War, when it was no longer acceptable to emphasise a closer link with defeated Germany.

A majority of Swedes, especially those born after World War II, are able to understand and speak English thanks to trade links, the popularity of overseas travel, a strong American influence, especially in regards to arts and culture, and the tradition of subtitling rather than dubbing foreign television shows and films. English, whether in American, Commonwealth (Australian, Canadian, and Kiwi) or British dialects, has been a compulsory subject for secondary school students studying natural sciences as early as 1849 and has been a compulsory subject for all Swedish students since 1952, when it replaced German.

Depending on local school authorities, English is currently a compulsory subject from third until ninth grade, and all students continue to study English in secondary school for at least another year. Most students also learn one and sometimes two additional languages; the most popular being German, French and Spanish. From the autumn semester 2014, Mandarin Chinese is proposed as a fourth additional language. Some Danish and Norwegian are also taught as part of Swedish language learning to emphasize differences and similarities between the languages.

=== English ===
There is currently an ongoing debate among linguists whether English should be considered a foreign language, second language or transcultural language in Sweden (and other Scandinavian countries) due to its widespread use in education and society in general. This has also triggered opposition: in 2002 the Swedish government proposed an action plan to strengthen the status of Swedish and in 2009 Swedish was announced the official language of the country for the first time in its history. Since 2011, Swedes have consistently been ranked among the best non-native English speakers in the world by EF Education First's English Proficiency Index, placing first on the Index in 2012, 2013, 2015 and 2018.

== Immigrant languages ==
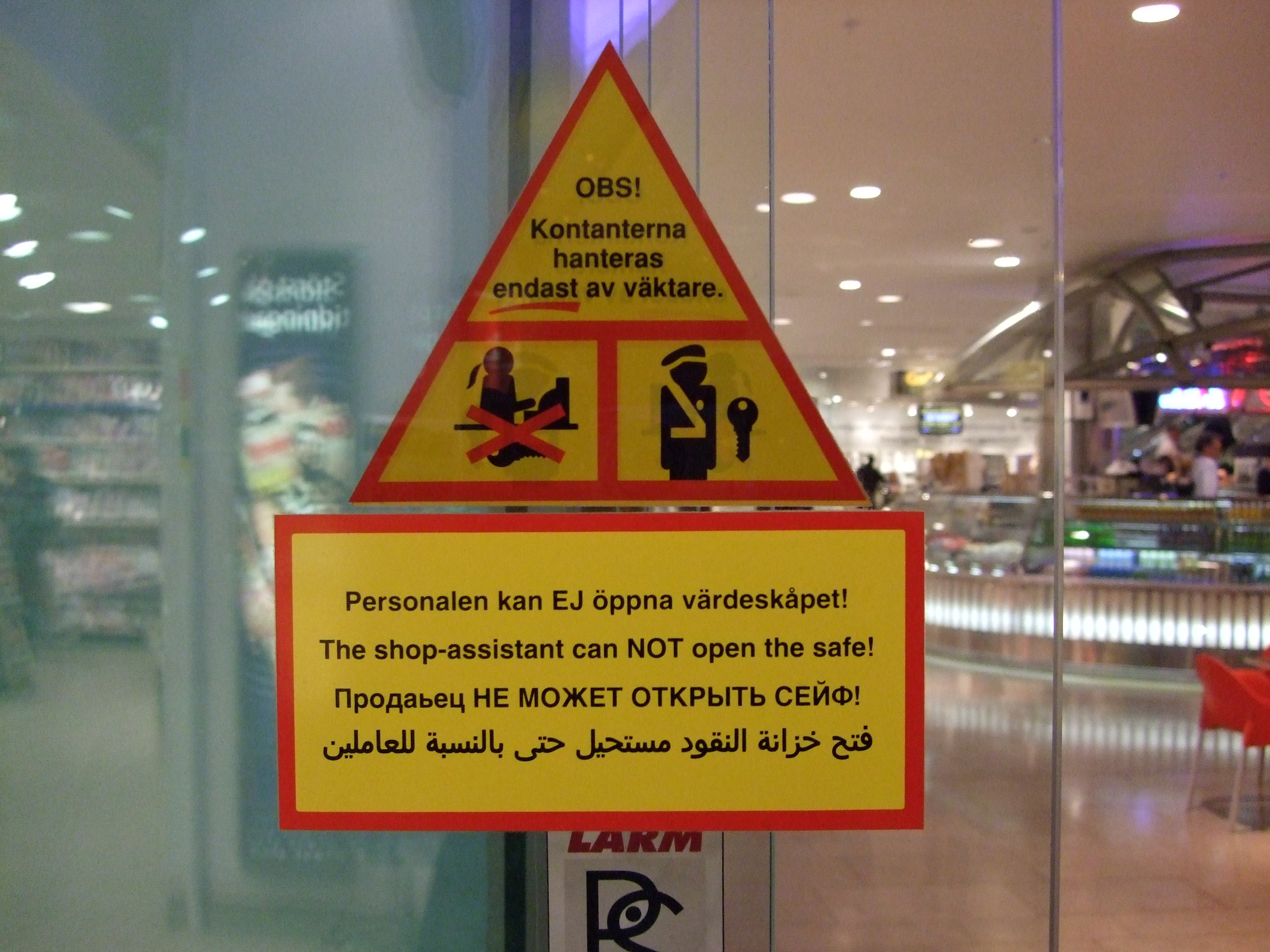
Sign in a shop in Swedish, English, Russian and Arabic.

Like many developed European countries from the late 1940s to the 1970s, Sweden has received tens of thousands of guest workers from countries in Southern Europe and the Middle East. Second- and third-generation Swedes of Southern European or Middle Eastern descent have adopted Swedish as their main tongue or in addition to their immigrant languages, such as Arabic, Bulgarian, Greek, Italian, Bosnian/Serbian/Croatian, and Turkish.

In 2016, language-learning service Duolingo shared first-party statistics which showed that most of the people using the service to study Swedish were actually located in Sweden, and that Sweden-based users were taking the Swedish course for English speakers more than any other course available on the service; the staff determined that both of these facts were a result of Sweden's large immigrant population.

== See also ==
- Swedish language
- Finnish language
- Meänkieli
- Sámi languages
- Romani language
- Yiddish language
- Languages of the European Union
- Minority language
