= Svenska dialektmysterier =

- Presented by: Fredrik Lindström
- Opening theme: "Dance with the Devil" by Phenomena
- Country of origin: Sweden
- Original language: Swedish
- No. of seasons: 2
- No. of episodes: 16

Production
- Producer: Sveriges Television
- Running time: 30 minutes

Original release
- Network: SVT2
- Release: 11 January 2006 – 2 May 2012

Svenska dialektmysterier is a Swedish television series about Swedish dialects. It was hosted by Fredrik Lindström and produced by Marcos Hellberg and broadcast on SVT2 in January 2006–May 2012. The programme can be seen as a continuation of Värsta språket, another series hosted by Lindström. It won the television award Kristallen in the infotainment category.

== Episodes ==
=== First Season (2006) ===
#	Title		Airdate
1	"Dialekter"	About dialects in general.	11 January 2006
2	"Norrland"	About Norrländska.	18 January 2006
3	"Skåneland"	About Scanian dialects.	25 January 2006
4	"Stockholm"	About Stockholmska.	1 February 2006
5	"Dalarna"	About Dalmål.	8 February 2006
6	"Glada väst"	About West-Swedish dialects.	15 February 2006
7	"Gnällbältet"	About the dialects in Gnällbältet.	22 February 2006
8	"Östsvenska"	About Finland Swedish.	1 March 2006

=== Second Season (2012) ===
#	Title		Airdate
1	"Värmländska"	About Värmländska.	14 March 2012
2	"Bohuslänska"	About Bohuslänska.	21 March 2012
3	"Blekingska"	About Blekingska.	28 March2012
4	"Överkalixmål"	About Överkalixmål.	4 April 2012
5	"Småländska"	About Småländska.	11 April 2012
6	"Uppländska"	About Uppländska.	18 April 2012
7	"Gotländska"	About Gotländska.	25 April 2012
8	"Rikssvenska"	About Rikssvenska.	2 May 2012
