= Gothenburg dialect =

Swedish dialect

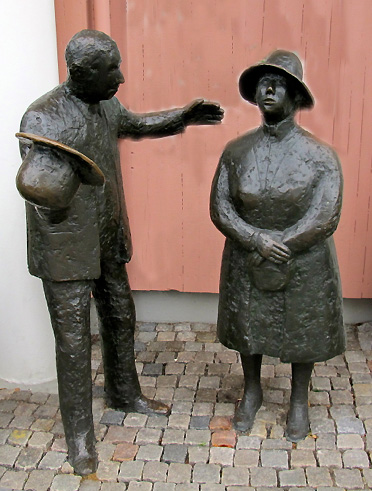
Kal & Ada symbolize Gothenburg's population and dialect. This sculpture is made in bronze by Svenrobert Lundquist and was unveiled in 1995 at Liseberg.

The Gothenburg dialect (Swedish: göteborgska) is the form of Swedish spoken in the city of Gothenburg with surroundings, and forms a part of the Götamål dialect area of western Sweden.

== History ==
The origins of the Gothenburg dialect can be traced to the industrialisation of the city in the late 19th century. The demand for factory workers caused rapid population growth through a large influx of people from the countryside, bringing with them their local dialects. These mainly belonged to the Götamål dialects, but also more distant Swedish dialects. As the new urban population adapted their speech, the different dialects mixed to create a new regional standard, and the children of the newcomers to the city—the second generation of Gothenburgers—were the first to natively speak what developed to become the Gothenburg dialect in the late 19th and early 20th century. One of the earliest uses of the word Göteborgsdialekten ("the Gothenburg dialect") is found in an 1891 article in the local newspaper Göteborgs Weckoblad. The Gothenburg dialect is as such a relatively new dialect compared to other Götamål dialects.

The dialect has been gradually converging with Standard Swedish over time, while some specific aspects of the dialect also have been intensified. At the same time, the dialect is spreading throughout Metropolitan Gothenburg and gaining ground in the more traditional Götamål-speaking areas outside the city. A study of secondary school students in the late 1990s found that the strongest dialectal aspects were found among students in the surrounding municipalities rather than in Gothenburg Municipality itself. The municipalities of Kungälv, Kungsbacka, Lerum, and Stenungsund now form part of the dialect continuum, while localities on the fringes of the metropolitan area like Uddevalla and Borås hold on to their more traditional dialects, like Västgötska.

== Status ==
Most speakers of the dialect are proud of it, and the Gothenburg dialect is also popular among other Swedes who commonly view it as happy, carefree, open, and sexy.
