= Schjerven =

Schjerven is a surname. Notable people with the surname include:

- Erik A. Schjerven (born 1980), Norwegian actor
- Petter Schjerven (born 1967), Norwegian television host
- Rolf Schjerven (1918–1978), Norwegian politician
- Torgeir Schjerven (born 1954), Norwegian author and lyric poet
