= Typisk norsk =

Norwegian television series

- Genre: Magazine program
- Created by: Dropout Productions, Rubicon TV
- Country of origin: Norway
- Original language: Norwegian
- No. of seasons: 3
- No. of episodes: 19

Production
- Running time: 28 minutes

Original release
- Network: NRK
- Release: 24 March 2004 – 26 March 2006

Typisk norsk (lit. 'Typical Norwegian') is a news and magazine program about language and communication produced by Dropout Productions (seasons 1 and 2) and Rubicon TV (season 3) for NRK. Three seasons of the program were produced (2004, 2005, and 2006). The concept is inspired by the Swedish SVT-produced series Värsta språket (lit. 'The Worst Language') with Fredrik Lindström as the host.

Petter Schjerven is the host of Typisk norsk. The program covers interesting topics in language and communication, among others. It also deals with language enthusiasts and researchers and discusses problems with the Norwegian language.

The first season had 453,000 viewers, the second season 553,000, and the third 622,000.

Typisk norsk won the Gullruten Award in 2005 for Best Culture or Magazine Program and Best Male Host. In 2006, the editors of the program received Den Store Journalistprisen.

Typisk norsk has covered, among other things:

- Word separation and hyphenation
- Slang
- How Norwegian sounds to immigrants
- Dialects
- Norwegian in comparison to Danish and Swedish
- Old Norse
- Where language ability comes from
- The guttural R sound
- The Norwegian method of counting
- Odd translations in films

== Kjell ==
"Kjell" (K with crossed-tail)

In 2005, Typisk norsk's Petter Schjerven presented the new letter kjell on the program, a letter to prevent the kj sound from being replaced by sj and disappearing from the language.

The letter kjell was proposed as a new letter of the Norwegian alphabet in 2005. It was a humorous proposal to promote the prescriptively correct pronunciation of the voiceless palatal fricative [ç], which is written ⟨kj⟩ in standard orthography, and oppose the growing tendency to pronounce it as a voiceless postalveolar fricative [ʃ] or voiceless alveolo-palatal fricative [ɕ], written ⟨sj⟩ or ⟨skj⟩, as the first sound in the word skjorte ("shirt"; /ʃuʈə/).

The voiceless palatal fricative [ç] is unstable in many Norwegian dialects and is disappearing from the speech of young people; younger speakers in Bergen, Stavanger and Oslo even merge /ç/ into the voiceless retroflex sibilant /ʂ/.

The proposal for the new letter was created by design agency SDG and presented by Petter Schjerven in the television program Typisk norsk. A similar glyph had been used before for /ç/ in the Norwegian phonetic transcription Norvegia, which has roots dating back to 1884.
