= Mälaren Valley =

Valley in Sweden

Coordinates: 59.5°N 16.75°E

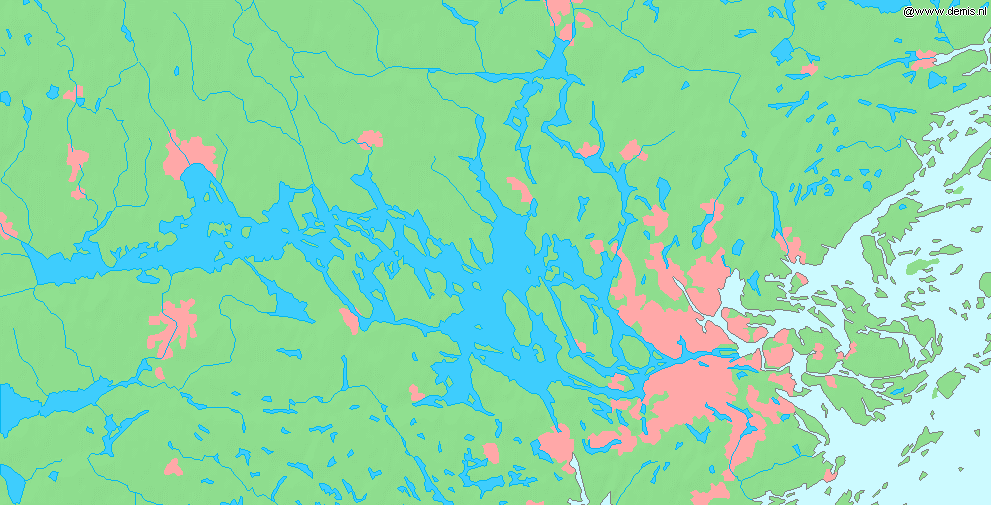
Lake Mälaren and the central parts of the Mälaren Valley

The Mälaren Valley (Swedish: Mälardalen), occasionally referred to as Stockholm-Mälaren Region (Stockholm-mälarregionen), is the easternmost part of Svealand, the catchment area of Lake Mälaren and the surrounding municipalities. The term is often used interchangeably for the extended capital region of Sweden as Stockholm is located at the lake's eastern end, at its outlet in the Baltic Sea.

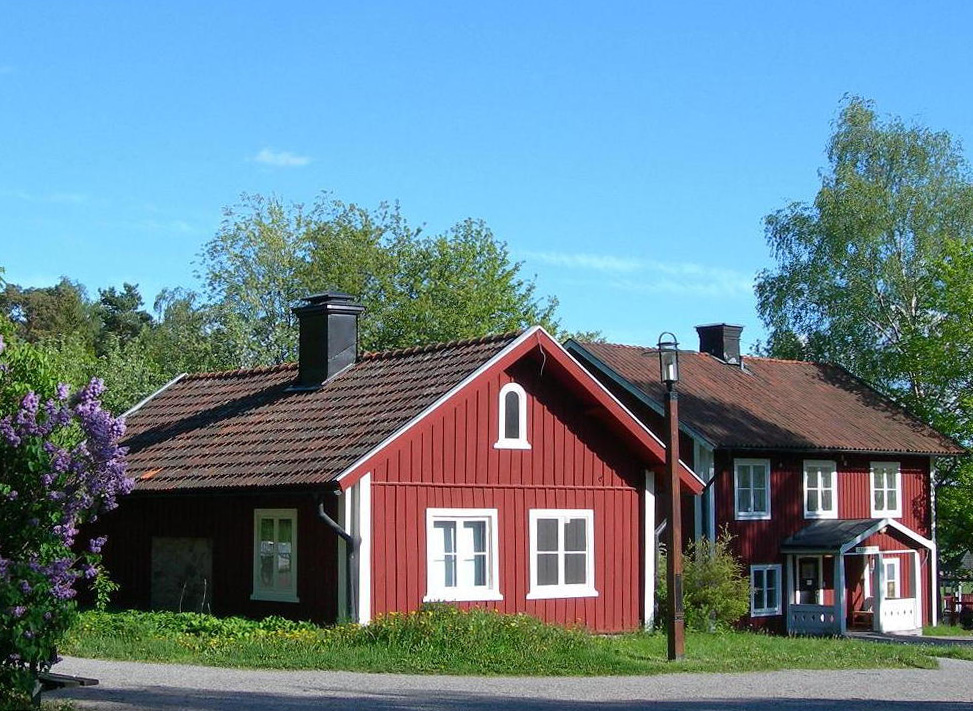
Red cottages that are typical of the Mälaren Valley

== Extent and characteristics ==
The Mälaren Valley, which never has been defined as an official region, has throughout Swedish history instead been shared by several provinces — Uppland, Södermanland, Västmanland, and Närke — and, in modern times, by several counties — Stockholm, Uppsala, Södermanland, Örebro, and Västmanland. In most cases, the Lake Hjälmaren region is included into the Mälaren Valley Region, if nothing else, for historical and cultural reasons.

Notwithstanding this, most people in Sweden will have a clear notion of what characterises the Mälaren Valley, while few of them will be able to define what those characteristics are more precisely. Arguably, this is because the region is not only homogeneous and has been so for many centuries, but also have had a tremendous influence on shared Swedish history and therefore never had to define its symbols or accentuate its distinctive features. During the late 19th and early 20th centuries when modern Swedish nationalism evolved, traits conceived as typical Swedish were more often than not characteristics of the Mälaren Valley. For example, the Falu red cottage with white corners, often iterated as a traditional Swedish building style, is common in the Mälaren Valley, but would stand out on the Swedish west coast. Similarly, what is referred to as Standard Swedish is often difficult to distinguish from dialects spoken around Lake Mälaren. One of the distinctive features of the region is its many large mansions — one of the finest surviving examples, the World Heritage Site Engelsberg Ironworks in the north-west corner of the region, is thought of as representative for Sweden in general.

== Population ==
Larger cities outside Greater Stockholm include Uppsala (population: 165,456), Västerås (128,534), Örebro (126,009), Södertälje (75,773) and Eskilstuna (70,342). As of 31 December 2020 more than 3.6 million people lived in this region, which may also be confined to a much smaller geographical area around Stockholm and Mälaren proper.

County	Capital	Area¹	Population	Density²
Stockholm County	Stockholm	6,514	2,391,990	367.2
Uppsala County	Uppsala	8,189	388,394	47.4
Örebro County	Örebro	8,504	305,643	35.9
Södermanland County	Nyköping	6,072	299,401	49.3
Västmanland County	Västerås	5,117	277,141	54.2
Total		34,396	3,662,569	106.5
1. Land area in km^{2}; 2. Population per km^{2}

== See also ==
- Metropolitan Stockholm
- Södertörn
