= Västgötska =

Swedish dialect

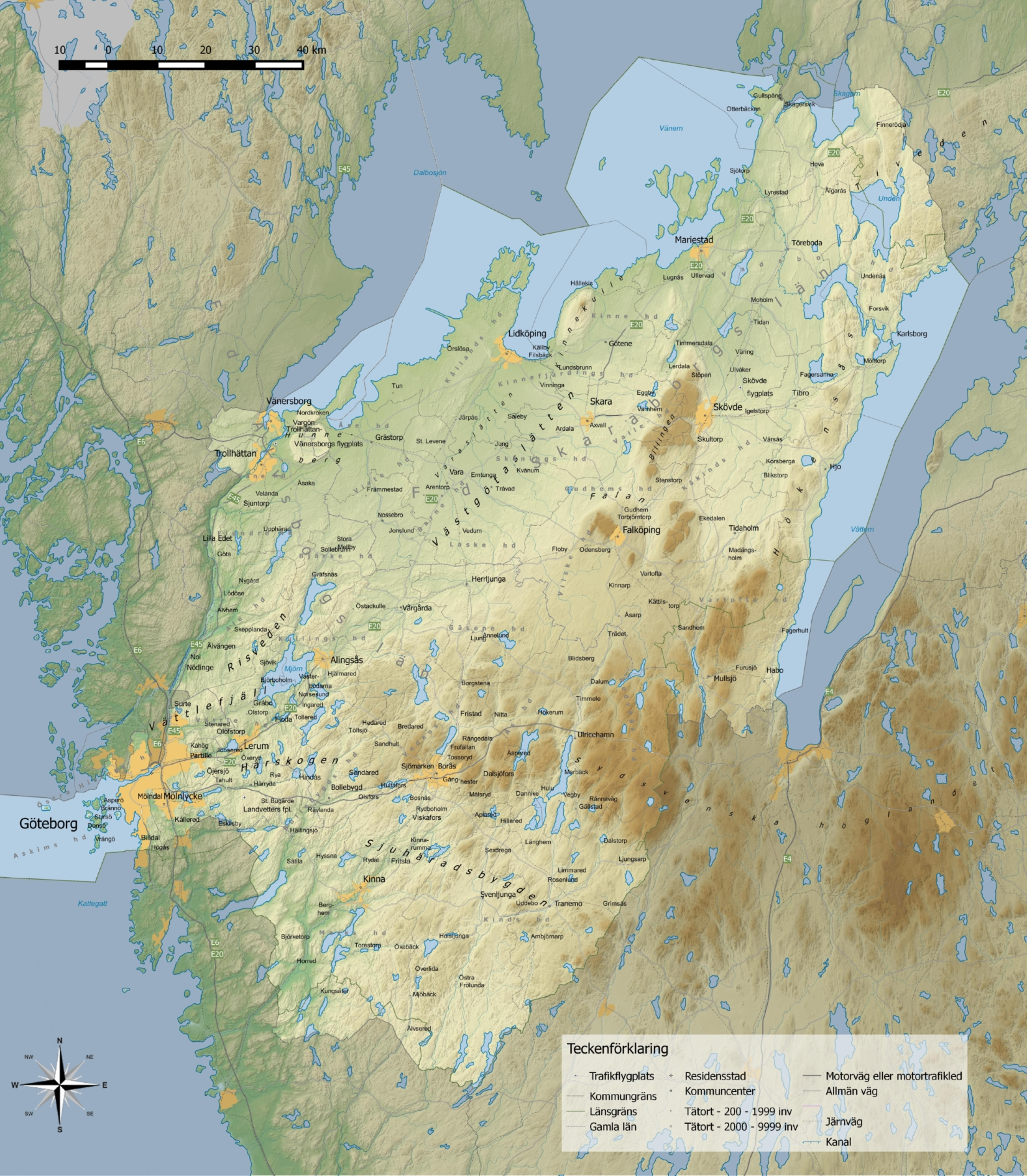
Map of Västergötland

Västgötska is a Swedish dialect spoken in the western Swedish province of Västergötland. Specifically, Västgötska commonly refers to several variants of the more broadly defined Götamål spoken across Västergötland except for Gothenburg where the Gothenburg dialect is spoken. The dialect is characterized by the frequent omission of terminal consonants (usually /r/ or /s/), and frequent use of [ø] and [ʊ] vowels.
