= Fredrik Lindström (writer) =

Swedish entertainer

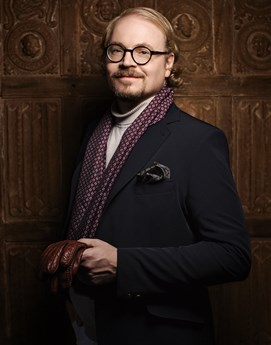
- Fredrik Lindström
- Born: 27 June 1963 (age 61)
- Occupation(s): linguist, comedian, film director, television presenter

Fredrik Lindström (born 27 June 1963 in Eskilstuna, Södermanland County) is a Swedish linguist, comedian, film director and presenter.

He played drums for the heavy metal band CRYSTAL PRIDE in the early 1980s.

Lindström is known as a reputed linguist with a penchant for Swedish dialects. In the 2000s, Lindström became a household name in Sweden through his documentary series Värsta språket about the Swedish language at Sveriges Television. Lindström has written several books that served as a basis for the series as well as historic linguistics in the Swedish language. They have the same kind of approach, mixing informality with information derived from the author's linguistics background.

Lindström's first encounter with the Swedish audience was on the radio show Hassan, on which he made prank calls to random people pretending to be different imaginary people, often with some kind of subtle disturbance that made the conversation farcical. The show aired on P3 for several seasons in the 1990s.

Since 2010, he has taken Björn Hellberg's role as the referee, in one of the most popular Television-Quizzes in Sweden ever, På spåret, which largely is a contest in geography, but also includes history, linguistics, sports and various subjects. In his role as referee, Lindström often excels in his knowledge of Swedish dialects.

A few years later, after various smaller appearances as a stand-up comedian, he directed two Swedish featured films in the comedy/drama genre; these featured well-known Swedish actors such as Mikael Persbrandt and Magnus Härenstam.

== Discography ==
=== Films ===
- Vuxna människor, 1999 (Adult Behaviour, lit. Adult People.)
- Känd från TV, 2001 (Recognized from TV)

=== Documentaries ===
- Harry Victor, 2001
- Värsta språket (The worst language)
- Svenska dialektmysterier (Swedish dialect mysteries)
- Världens modernaste land (The world's most modern country)

=== Radio shows ===
- Hassan, early to mid 1990s
- På Minuten, (the Swedish version of the BBC radio game show Just a Minute)

=== TV shows ===
- Tommy på Skitiga duken on ZTV (Tommy at Skitiga duken)
- Ingesson
- Pangbulle (Bang bun)
- Pentagon
- c/o Segemyhr
- Detta har hänt (This has happened)

=== Music ===
- Crystal Pride

=== CDs ===
- www.matapa.nu, at Mosebacke in Stockholm during the spring of 1999 ( www.foodmonkey.nu)

=== Books ===
- Världens dåligaste språk ("The World's Baddest [sic] Language"), 2000
- Vad gör alla superokända människor hela dagarna? ("What Do All the Super-unknown People Do All day?"), 2001
- Jordens smartaste ord ("The smartest words on earth"), 2002
- Vem är Björn och vem är Benny? ("Which one is Björn [Ulvaeus] and which one is Benny [Andersson]?"), 2004
- Jag är en sån som bara vill ligga med dig ("I'm the Kind Who Only Wants to Sleep With You"), 2005
- Svitjods undergång och Sveriges födelse ("The Fall of Svitjod and the Birth of Sweden") with Henrik Lindström, 2006
- Evolutionen och jag kommer inte överens ("Evolution and I don't get along"), 2010
- När börjar det riktiga livet? ("When does the real life start?"), 2011

=== Prizes and awards ===
- 1999 – Kvällspostens Edvardspris (Edvard prize awarded by the evening edition of the daily newspaper Expressen)
- 2001 – Karamelodiktstipendiat[6] (scholarship awarded yearly from a fund managed by the Royal Swedish Music Academy)
- 2002 – Tage Danielsson-priset (Tage Danielsson prize, awarded in memory of Swedish poet, writer, film director, actor and comedian Tage Danielsson)
- 2002 – Mensapriset (Mensa award, awarded by Mensa Sweden, the Swedish chapter of the international Mensa organization)
- 2002 – Månadens stockholmare i maj (Stockholm personality of the month, awarded by The City of Stockholm)
- 2003 – Aftonbladets TV-pris för bästa manliga TV-personlighet (Best TV male personality prize, awarded by the daily newspaper Aftonbladet)
- 2003 – Uppsala universitets och Studentbokhandeln AB:s Disapris (Disa prize, awarded by Uppsala University and the Student Bookstore in recognition of notable contributions to popular writing)
- 2003 – Nationalencyklopedins Kunskapspriset (The Knowledge Prize, awarded by the National Encyclopedia of Sweden)
- 2006 – Årets bok om svensk historia för "Svitjods undergång och Sveriges födelse" (Historic Book of the Year, awarded by the online newspaper "Svesnk Historia", Swedish History)
- 2006 – Aftonbladets TV-pris för bästa manliga TV-personlighet (Best TV male personality prize, awarded by the daily newspaper Aftonbladet)
- 2009 – Natur & Kulturs Kulturpris (Culture Prize, awarded by the Natur & Kultur foundation)
