= Värsta språket =

- Presented by: Fredrik Lindström
- Country of origin: Sweden
- Original language: Swedish
- No. of seasons: 2

Production
- Producer: Sveriges Television
- Running time: 30 minutes

Original release
- Network: SVT2
- Release: 31 October 2002 – 8 April 2003

Värsta språket (Swedish: "The Worst Language" (figuratively "The coolest language")) was a Swedish television series about the Swedish language. The series, which was hosted by Fredrik Lindström and produced by Karin af Klintberg, was broadcast on SVT between October 2002 and April 2003. The series discussed issues with the Swedish language in an entertaining way.

After two seasons, Fredrik Lindström claimed that the attention from the programme was a burden to him and that he would no longer host it anymore. The show was therefore put on hiatus. Lindström did however return with another language-related series called Svenska dialektmysterier in 2006.

Lindström and af Klintberg were given Stora journalistpriset for the programme.

Much of what was mentioned in the show is recorded and can be read in Lindström's two books: Världens dåligaste språk ("The World's baddest [sic!] language") and Jordens smartaste ord ("The smartest words on Earth").

== See also ==
- Typisk norsk – a Norwegian television program based on the concept
