= Swedish dialects =

Various forms of the Swedish language

Swedish dialects are the various forms of the Swedish language, particularly those that differ considerably from Standard Swedish.

== Traditional dialects ==
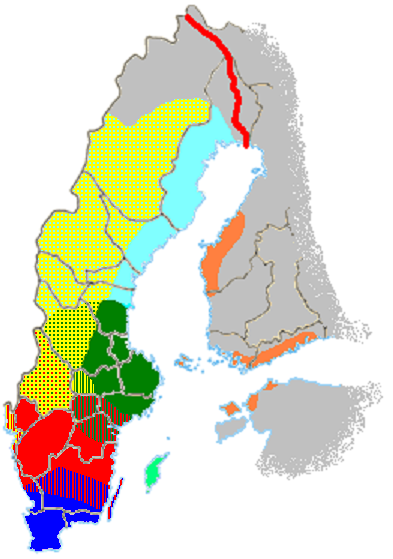
Map showing the Swedish dialects traditionally spoken. (Even the northernmost part of Sweden now speaks Swedish, the Estonian dialects are almost extinct, and the extent of Swedish has greatly narrowed in Southern Finland — see Finland Swedish.)

The linguistic definition of a Swedish traditional dialect, in the literature merely called 'dialect', is a local variant that has not been heavily influenced by Standard Swedish and that can trace a separate development back to Old Norse. Many of the genuine rural dialects have very distinct phonetic and grammatical features, such as plural forms of verbs or archaic case inflections. These dialects can be nearly incomprehensible to most Swedes, and most of their speakers are also fluent in Standard Swedish.

The different dialects are often so localized that they are limited to individual parishes and are referred to by Swedish linguists as sockenmål (lit. "parish speech"). They are generally separated into the six traditional dialect groups, with common characteristics of prosody, grammar and vocabulary. The color represents the core area and the samples are from Svenska Dagbladet's dialect project.

South Swedish dialects (dark blue); (Skåne, Perstorps socken, N. Åsbo härad).
Götaland dialects (red); (Västergötland, Korsberga socken, Vartofta härad, Skaraborgs län).
Svealand dialects (dark green); (Uppland, Håtuna socken, Håbo härad).
Norrland dialects (light blue); (Västerbotten, Skellefte socken, Löparnäs).
Finland Swedish and Estonian Swedish (orange); (Finland, Österbotten, Sideby socken).
Gotland dialects (light green); (Gotland, När Socken, Gotlands södra härad).

The areas with mixed colors as stripes are transitional areas. The parts in yellow with coloured dots represent various distinct dialect areas which are not easily defined as belonging to any of the six major groups above. The areas west of the core for Norrland dialects, west of Svealand dialects and north of Götaland dialects are related to each of these, respectively, indicated by the colour of the dots. Samples from these areas: Jämtland, Föllinge socken (related to Norrland dialects), Dalarna, Älvdalens socken (related to Svealand dialects) and Värmland, Nordmarks härad, Töcksmarks socken (related to Götaland dialects). The dialects of this category have in common that they all show more or less strong Norwegian influences, especially the dialects in Härjedalen, Northwestern Jämtland and Northwestern Dalarna. Dialects often show similarities along traditional travelling routes such as the great rivers in Northern Sweden, which start in the mountains at the Norwegian border and then follow a South-Easterly path towards the Bothnian Sea. The grey areas do not have any independently developed Swedish dialect, as other languages vastly predominate.

Here is a summary of some of the most important differences between the major groups.

Feature	South Swedish dialects	Götaland dialects	Svealand dialects	Norrland dialects	Finland Swedish dialects	Gotland dialects
Diphthongs	Secondary in most of the area	No	No	Primary everywhere, secondary only in north	Primary and secondary	Primary and secondary
Final -a dropping	No	Weakened in parts of the area	No	Vowel balance	Vowel balance	Weakened in most of the area
Final -n dropping	No	Yes	Small part of the area	Yes	No	Yes
Final -t dropping	No	Yes	Yes	Yes	Yes	Yes
Intervocalic g > j or w	Most of the area	No	No	No	No	No
Long a /aː/ > å /oː/	Yes (secondary diphthong)	Yes	Yes	Mostly, except the north	Partially	No
Long vowel in short stemmed words, before voiceless obstruents	Yes	Yes	No	Some of the system of short stemmed words preserved	Some of the system of short stemmed words preserved	No
Palatalized initial g, k, sk	Yes	Yes	Yes	Yes	Yes	No
Plosive voicing	Most of the area	No	No	No	No	No
Preterite -de dropping	Some of the area	Some of the area	Yes	Yes	Yes	Only the -e is dropped
Plural -r dropping	Yes	Yes	No	In north	No	No
Postpositive possessive pronouns	No	Only family words	Only family words	Yes	Yes	Only family words
Retroflex coalescence	No	Yes	Yes	Yes	Some of the area	No
Stem vowel i, y > e, ö	Yes	Yes	No	No	No	No
"Thick l" [ɺ]	No	Yes	Yes	Yes	Some of the area	No
Vowel allophones before r	Back	Back and front	Front	Front	Front	Front
Vowel length/tenseness balance	No	No	No	Yes	Yes	No

Note that this table does not hold for the distinct (dotted) or transitional (striped) areas.

Götaland dialects are mostly used in Västergötland, Dalsland, northern Halland, northern Småland and Östergötland although they are also heard in Bohuslän, Värmland (a special case, in many ways), and Öland. Examples of Götaland dialect features are vowel reduction, vowel shortening in front of endings and loss of -r in suffixes (as in hästa' (hästar = horses)).

A characteristic of Svealand dialects is the coalescence of the alveolar trill with following dental and alveolar consonants — also over word-boundaries — that transforms them into retroflex consonants that in some cases reduces the distinction between words (as for instance vana — varna, i.e. "habit" — "warn"). This feature is also found in East Norwegian, North Swedish and in some dialects of Scottish Gaelic.

- /r/ + /l/ → [ɭ]
- /r/ + /n/ → [ɳ]
- /r/ + /s/ → [ʂ]
- /r/ + /t/ → [ʈ]
- /r/ + /d/ → [ɖ] or in some dialects [ɽ]

== Classification ==
The following dialect groups are sometimes classified as "Swedish" in the broadest sense (North Scandinavian):

- Archaic Gutnish
- Dalecarlian
- Archaic Finnish Swedish, Estonian Swedish, Swedish
- Archaic Norrlandic, Jamtska

Dalecarlian is intermediate in some respects between East and West Scandinavian. The Scanian dialect is southern East Scandinavian, along with Danish and Jutish.

== See also ==
- Norwegian dialects
- Danish dialects
- Scanian dialects
