= Gnällbältet =

Region of central Sweden

Gnällbältet (Swedish, "the whine belt") is an informal name referring to a geographic belt in central Sweden where the dialects have certain features in common, mostly extensive usage of the schwa sound. The belt consists of Västmanland, Närke and the western parts of Södermanland, but is characteristic to a much reduced degree throughout the Mälaren Valley.

In the Eastern Swedish dialects there is a more pronounced HL-fall than in the Eastern dialects of Stockholm and environs.
