= Scanian dialect =

Dialect of southern Swedish

Scanian
- skånska
- Native to: Sweden
- Region: Scania
- Language family: Indo-European: Germanic; North Germanic; East Scandinavian; Swedish or Danish; South Swedish or East Danish; Scanian

Language codes
- ISO 639-3: scy (rejected)
- Glottolog: skan1239
- IETF: sv-u-sd-sem
- Scania in southern Sweden

Scanian (Swedish: skånska [ˈskɔ̂nːska]) is an East Scandinavian dialect spoken in the province of Scania in southern Sweden.

Broadly speaking, Scanian has been classified in three different ways:

1. Older Scanian formed part of the old Scandinavian dialect continuum, and is by most historical linguists considered to be an East Danish dialect group.
2. Due to the modern-era influence from Standard Swedish in the region, and because traditional dialectology in the Scandinavian countries normally has not considered isoglosses that cut across state borders, the Scanian dialects have normally been treated as part of the South Swedish dialects by Swedish dialectologists.
3. Many of the early Scandinavian linguists, including Adolf Noreen and G. Sjöstedt, classified it as "South Scandinavian", and some linguists, such as Elias Wessén, also considered Old Scanian a separate language, classified apart from both Old Danish and Old Swedish.

== Status ==
There has been active campaigning from local Scanian interest groups to promote Scanian as a separate language on par with the official minority languages, though this has been rejected by Swedish authorities. Swedish linguists generally view Scanian as just one of many local or regional Swedish (or Scandinavian) dialects, some of which differ considerably from Standard Swedish but don't meet the criteria of a separate language.

Scanian was originally classified as a separate language in ISO 639-3, but was declassified as a language in 2009. A request for reinstatement was submitted during the 2009 annual review process, but rejected on the grounds of mutual intelligibility; it is listed in ISO 639-6 with code scyr.

The official stance of the Swedish government, as relayed through the Institute for language and folklore, is that all languages and dialects which have developed from "a Nordic proto-language", regardless of how independent their development has been from Swedish itself, are de facto Swedish dialects by virtue of being spoken on the territory where Swedish is the national or official language.

== History ==
Swedish and Danish are considered to have once been part of the same dialect, Old East Norse, up until the 12th century. However, some scholars speculate that there might have been certain dialect differences within the Nordic language area as early as the Proto-Nordic period. The term Swedish is not mentioned specifically in any source until the first half of the 14th century, and no standard spoken language had developed in either Sweden or Denmark before 1500, although some scholars argue that there may have been tendencies towards a more formal "courteous" language among the aristocracy.

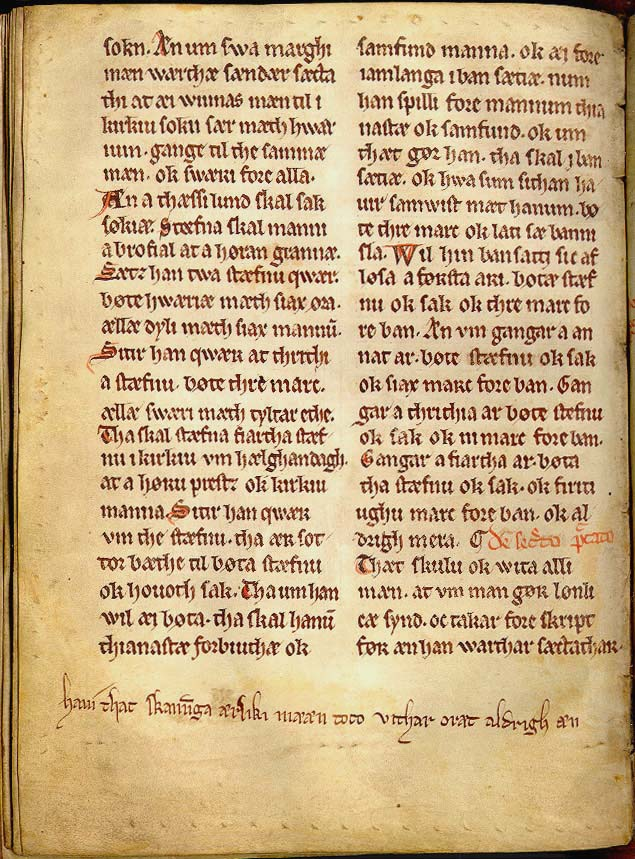
Anders Sunesøn's 13th century version of the Scanian Law and Church Law, containing a comment in the margin called the "Skaaningestrof": "Hauí that skanunga ærliki mææn toco vithar oræt aldrigh æn." (Let it be known that Scanians are honorable men who have never tolerated injustice.)

Scanian appeared in writing before 1200, at a time when Swedish and Danish had yet to be codified, and the long struggle between Sweden and Denmark over the right to claim the Old Scanian manuscripts as an early form of either of the two national state languages has led to some odd twists and turns. Two Scanian fragments dated to around 1325 were initially claimed to be (younger) Old Swedish, but further research in modern times has claimed that the language was not Swedish, but Scanian. During the 20th century the fragments were thus relabeled early Old Danish by Scandinavian linguists, and as explained by Danish linguist Britta Olrik Frederiksen, the fragments are now thought to "represent as such a newly claimed territory for the history of the Danish language". Like the Scanian Law, one of the fragments, a six-leaf fragment (catalogued as SKB A 120), is written in the runic alphabet. The place of writing, according to Frederiksen, has been tentatively identified as the Cistercian monastery at Herrevad Abbey in Scania. The fragment contains a translation of Mary's lament at the cross. The other fragment (catalogued as SKB *A 115) is a bifolium with just over a hundred metrical lines of knittelvers, a translation from Latin of the apocryphal gospel Evangelium Nicodemi about Christ's descent into hell and resurrection.

In modern Scandinavian linguistic research, the assertion that Old Scanian was a Swedish dialect before the Swedish acquisition of most of old Skåneland is now seldom argued by linguistic scholars, although the comparative and historical research efforts continue.

One of the artifacts sometimes referred to as support for the view of Scanian as separate from both the Swedish and Danish language is a letter from the 16th century, where the Danish Bible translators were advised not to employ Scanian translators since their language was not "proper Danish".

=== Language politics ===
As pointed out by the Norwegian scholar Lars S. Vikør, professor, Nordic and Linguistics Studies, University of Oslo, in the 2001 book Language and Nationalism, the "animosity between the two countries [Sweden and Denmark], and the relative closeness of their standard languages (dialectal differences within each of the two countries were greater than [between] the two standards), made it imperative to stress the difference between them in the standardization process". According to Vikør, the "Swedish treatment of the Scanians perhaps shows [that] the most important element of the [linguistic nationalism] ideology is the desire to stress the difference from another linguistic entity that in some way may be considered threatening or challenging one's own autonomy."

In Scania, the Swedish government officially limited the use of Scanian in 1683. Scania became fully integrated into the Swedish Kingdom in 1719, and the assimilation accelerated during the 20th century, with the dominance of Standard Swedish-language radio and television, urbanization, and movement of people to and from the other regions of Sweden.

Bornholm was once part of Skåneland but rebelled and returned to Denmark in 1660. The Scanian dialect of Bornholm remained in use as a functioning transitional stage, but Standard Danish soon became dominant in official contexts, and the dialect is thought to be disappearing.

=== Historic shifts ===
The gradual transition to Swedish has resulted in the introduction of many new Swedish characteristics into Scanian since the 18th century, especially when it comes to vocabulary and grammar. In spite of the shift, Scanian dialects have maintained a non-Swedish prosody, as well as details of grammar and vocabulary that in some aspects differ from Standard Swedish. The prosody, pronunciation of vowels and consonants in such qualities as length, stress and intonation has more in common with Danish, German and Dutch (and occasionally English) than with Swedish.

However, as pointed out by the researchers involved in the project Comparative Semantics for Nordic Languages, it is difficult to quantify and analyze the fine degrees of semantic differences that exist between the Scandinavian languages in general, even between the national languages Danish, Swedish and Norwegian: "[S]ome of the Nordic languages [..] are historically, lexically and structurally very similar. [...] Are there systematic semantic differences between these languages? If so, are the formal semantic analytic tools that have been developed mainly for English and German sufficiently fine-grained to account for the differences among the Scandinavian languages?"

Research that provides a cross-border overview of the spectrum of modern dialects in the Nordic region has recently been initiated through the Scandinavian Dialect Syntax Project, based at the University of Tromsø, in Norway, in which nine Scandinavian research groups collaborate for the systematic mapping and studying of the syntactic variation across the Scandinavian dialect continuum.

=== Historic preservation ===
Scanian once had many unique words which do not exist in either Swedish or Danish. In attempts to preserve the unique aspects of Scanian, the words have been recorded and documented by the Institute for Dialectology, Onomastics and Folklore Research in Sweden. Preservation is also accomplished by comparative studies such as the Scanian-Swedish-Danish dictionary project, commissioned by the Scanian Academy. This project is led by Helmer Lång and involves a group of scholars from different fields, including Birger Bergh, linguistics, Inger Elkjær and Inge Lise Pedersen, researcher of Danish dialects.

Several Scanian dictionaries have been published over the years, including one by Sten Bertil Vide, who wrote his doctoral thesis on the names of plants in South Swedish dialects. This publication and a variety of other Scanian dictionaries are available through the Department of Dialectology and Onomastics in Lund.

== Phonology ==
Scanian realizes the phoneme /r/ as a uvular trill [ʀ] in clear articulation, but everyday speech has more commonly a voiceless [χ] or a voiced uvular fricative [ʁ], depending on phonetic context. That is in contrast to the alveolar articulations and retroflex assimilations in most Swedish dialects north of Småland.

The realizations of the highly variable and uniquely Swedish fricative /ɧ/ also tend to be more velar and less labialized than in other dialects. The phonemes of Scanian correspond to those of Standard Swedish and most other Swedish dialects and sounds like /x/, but long vowels have developed into diphthongs that are unique to the region (such as /ʉː/ and /ɑː/ being realized [eʉ] and [aɑ], respectively). In the southern parts of Scania, many diphthongs also have a pharyngeal quality, similar to Danish vowels.

== Vocabulary ==
Scanian used to have many words which differed from standard Swedish. In 1995 Skånska Akademien released Skånsk-svensk-dansk ordbok, a dictionary with 2,711 Scanian words and expressions. It should be mentioned however that not all of these words are in wide use today. While the general vocabulary in modern Scanian does not differ considerably from Standard Swedish, a few specifically Scanian words still exist which are known in all of Scania, occurring frequently among a majority of the speakers. These are some examples:

- alika, "jackdaw" (Standard Swedish: kaja, Danish: allike)
- elling, "duckling" (Standard Swedish: ankunge, Danish: ælling)
- hutta, "throw" (Standard Swedish: kasta, Danish: kaste)
- hoe, "head" (Standard Swedish: huvud, Danish: hoved)
- glytt, "very young boy"
- glyttig, "silly, frivolous" (Standard Swedish: tramsig)
- grebba, "women, girl" (Standard Swedish: flicka)
- fjåne, "idiot". (Standard Swedish: fåne)
- fubbick, "idiot".
- grunna (på), think about (Standard Swedish: fundera or grunna, Danish: overveje or fundere)
- hiad, "(very) hungry for" (Standard Swedish: (mycket) sugen på, (poetic) Danish: hige efter)
- hialös, "restless; impatient" (Standard Swedish: otålig or rastlös, Danish: hvileløs, rastløs, or utålmodig)
- märr, "mare" (Standard Swedish: sto or more unusual märr, Danish: mare)
- mög, "dirt; excrements" (Standard Swedish: smuts, Danish: møg)
- mölla, "mill" (Standard Swedish: (väder-)kvarn, Danish: mølle)
  - This word is used in many geographical names – Examples
  - Möllevången, a neighbourhood in Malmö
  - Svanemøllen, a station in Copenhagen
  - Möllebacken (Scanian dialect) and Møllebakken (Danish) are names for countless number of hills, "Mill Hill" in English.
- pantoffel, "potato" (Standard Swedish: potatis, Danish: kartoffel)
- påg, "boy" (Standard Swedish: pojke, archaic Danish: poge / pog, standard Danish: dreng)
- rälig, "disgusting", "ugly", "frightening" (Standard Swedish äcklig, ful, skrämmande/otäck, former Swedish rädelig, dialect Danish: rærlig Danish: ulækkert, grim)
- rullebör, "wheelbarrow" (Standard Swedish: skottkärra, Danish: hjulbør, trillebør)
- romma, "hit" (Standard Swedish: träffa, Danish: ramme or træffe)
- tradig, "boring" (Standard Swedish: tråkig or colloquial "tradig", Danish: træls/kedelig)
- tåcke, "cock, rooster" (Standard Swedish: tupp, Danish: hane)
- spann, "bucket" (Standard Swedish: hink or occasional "spann", Danish: spand)
- skobann or skoband, "shoelace" (Standard Swedish: skosnöre, Danish: snørebånd)
- syllten, "hungry" (Standard Swedish: hungrig, archaic Swedish svulten, Danish: sulten)
- tös, "girl" (Standard Swedish: flicka or tös (archaic), Danish: pige or tøs)
- vann, "water" (Standard Swedish: vatten, Danish: vand)
- vindmölla, "wind turbine" (Standard Swedish: vindkraftverk, Danish: vindmølle)
- vång, "meadow" (Standard Swedish: äng, Danish: eng or (archaic and poetic) vang) (as in Möllevången, Malmö, "Mill Meadow")
- eda, "to eat" (Standard Swedish: äta, Danish: spise or æde (mostly used for animals))
- flabb, "mouth" (Standard Swedish: mun, Danish: mund or flab (an animal's mouth, but can also mean a mouthy person))
- fälleben, "to fall, to trip" (Standard Swedish: krokben, Danish: falde or spænde ben)
- ålahue, "stupid person" (Standard Swedish: idiot)

== Notable speakers ==
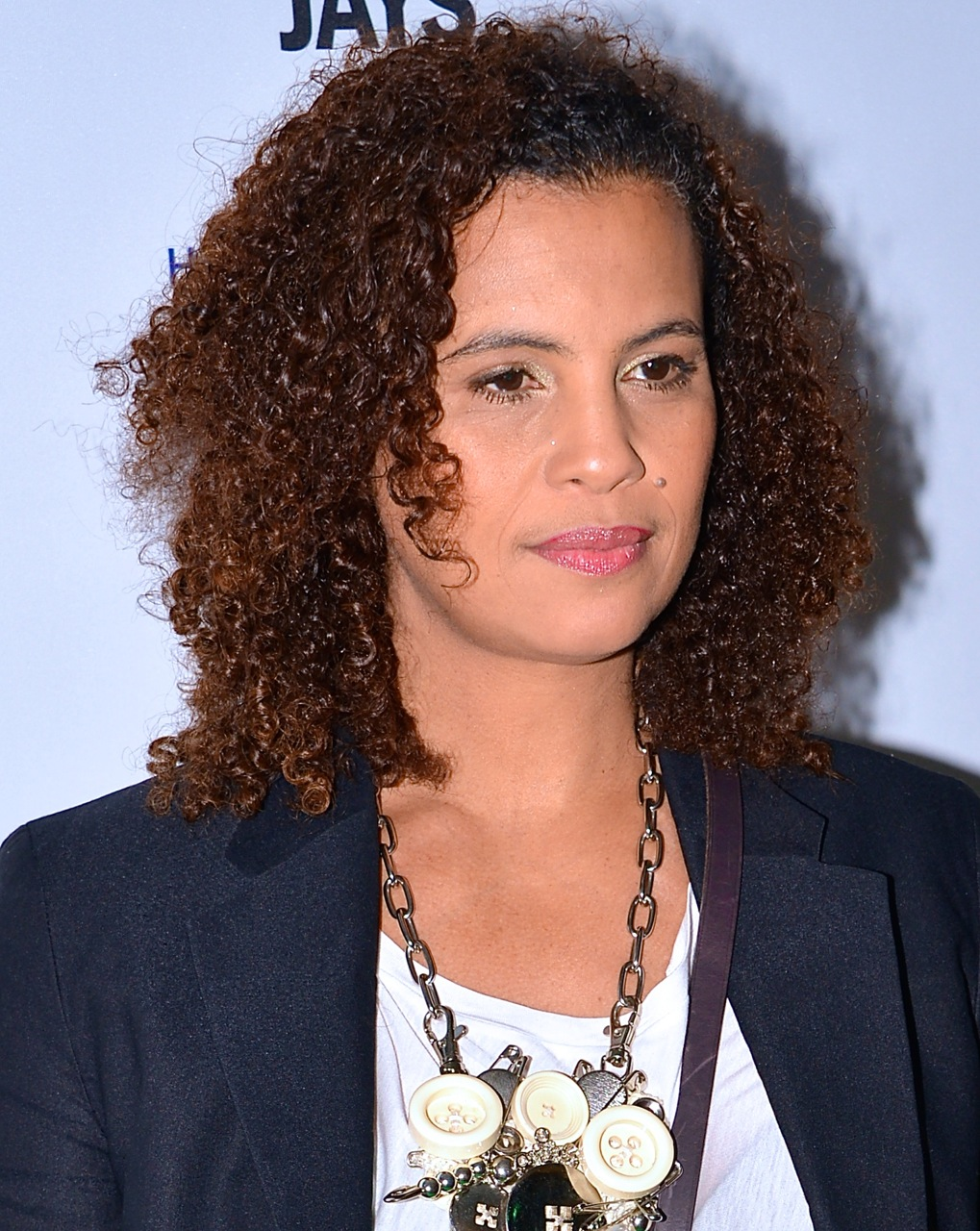
Neneh Cherry

- Hasse Andersson (born 1948), singer and songwriter
- Neneh Cherry (born 1964), singer, songwriter, rapper, occasional disc jockey, and broadcaster
- Jonathan Conricus (born 1979), Swedish-Israeli IDF Lieutenant-Colonel (ret.), IDF International Spokesperson
- Kal P. Dal (1949–1985), rock musician
- Elecktra (born 1987), drag queen and singer, known for performing in Scanian
- Marie Fredriksson (1958–2019) Singer, Roxette
- Henrik Larsson (born 1971), Footballer
- Tina Nordström (born 1973), celebrity TV chef
- Edvard Persson (1888-1957), singer and actor
- Peps Persson (1946–2021), blues and reggae musician and social critic
- Markus Rosenberg (born 1982), Footballer

== See also ==
- Bornholmsk
- Elfdalian
- Jamtlandic
- Västgötska
