= Uppländska dialect =

Swedish dialect

Uppländska is a variety of Svealand Swedish spoken in Uppland. The variety is traditionally subdivided into three separate "dialect" areas: The Tiundaland (in the north), Attundaland (in the southeast) and Fjädrundraland (in the southwest) dialects. Usage has declined in recent decades, but restoration attempts have been made by linguistic societies. It is primarily spoken in Uppland, Stockholm and in Åland.
