= Erik A. Schjerven =

Norwegian actor (born 1980)

Erik Aleksander Schjerven
- Born: 16 October 1980 (age 45); Norway
- Other name: Erik A. Schjerven
- Occupation: Actor

Erik Aleksander Schjerven (born 16 October 1980) is a Norwegian actor.

== Education ==
He graduated from the London Academy of Music and Dramatic Art in London, United Kingdom, in 2009.

== Career ==
Schjerven is notable for playing Albert Lunde on the Norwegian soap-opera television series Hotel Cæsar from 1998 throughout 2000.

He has also appeared in Fox Grønland, a crime series on TV 2, a Norwegian television channel.

Schjerven played Jon Hatland in Max Manus (2008), a Norwegian biographical war film based on the real events of the life of World War II resistance fighter Max Manus (1914–1996).

He will be seen in the upcoming film Robin Hood (2010), scheduled to be released on 14 May 2010.

== Personal life ==
His brother, Petter Schjerven, is a television host on the Norwegian Broadcasting Corporation (NRK) television channel.
