= Petter Schjerven =

Norwegian television host

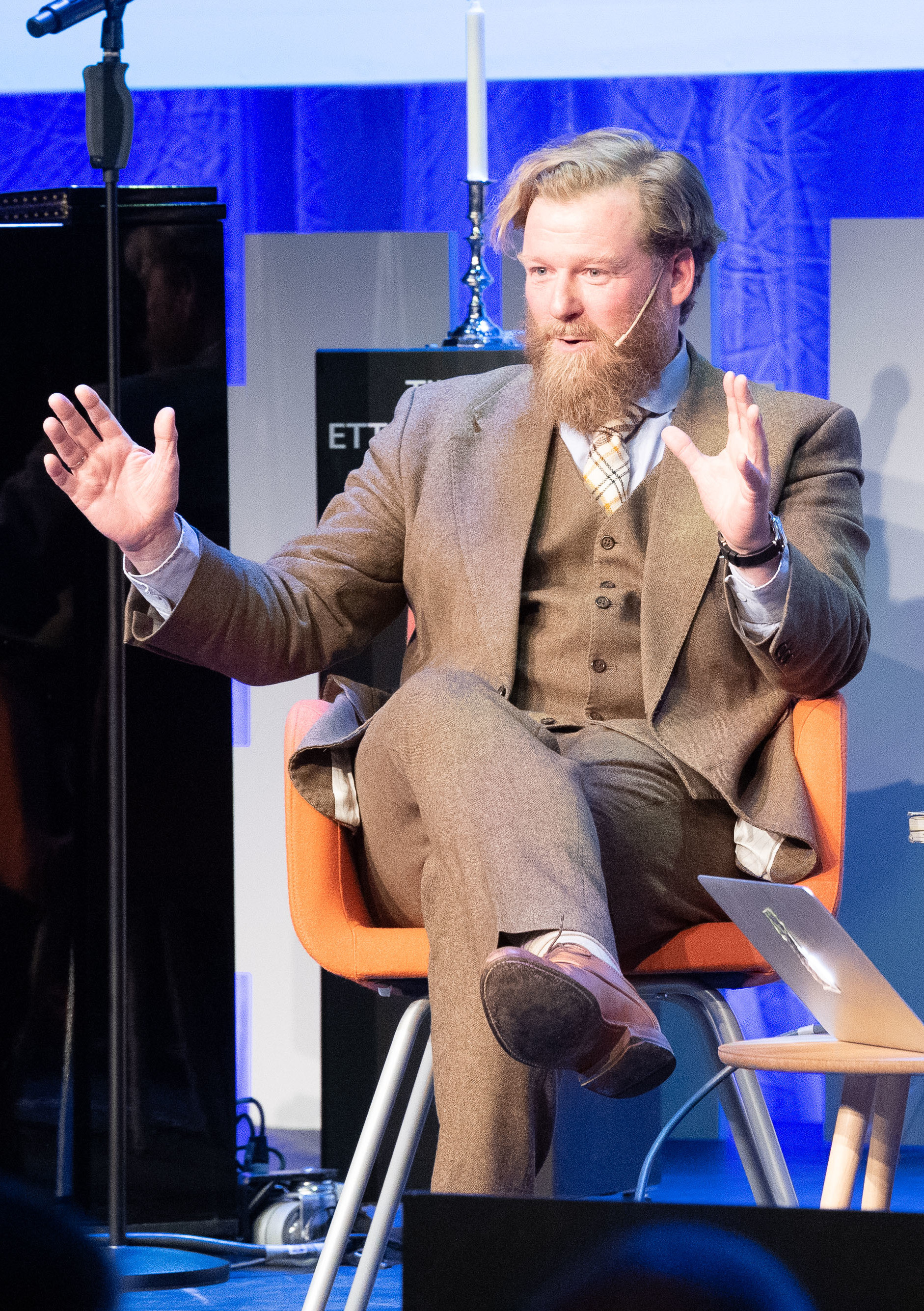
- Petter Schjerven in 2019.
- Born: 20 October 1967 (age 58)
- Education: University of Oslo
- Occupation: Television host
- Relatives: Erik Aleksander Schjerven (brother)

Petter Wilhelm Blichfeldt Schjerven (born 20 October 1967) is a Norwegian television host, known from Typisk norsk which aired on NRK, the Norwegian Broadcasting Corporation. Schjerven has previously worked as the host and scriptwriter for the children's program Midt i smørøyet and as the producer of the radio program Holger Nielsens Metode on NRK P3, among others. After Typisk norsk he hosted the shows Eva og Adam and Tingenes tilstand on NRK and Typisk deg on TVNorge.

Schjerven was awarded Gullruten, a Norwegian television award, for best male television host in 2005.

Schjerven began his entertainment career at Nordstrandrevyen, a school revue.

He has a cand.mag. degree and has studied psychology, Norwegian, media studies, and philosophy.

He is the older brother of actor Erik A. Schjerven.
