= Ingesson =

Ingesson is a Scandinavian surname. Notable people with the surname include:

- Klas Ingesson (1968–2014), Swedish footballer and manager
- Magnus Ingesson (born 1971), Swedish cross country skier
