= Gotlandic =

Dialect of Swedish

Gotlandic (Swedish: gotländska) is the form of Swedish spoken on the islands of Gotland and Fårö in the Baltic Sea.

The dialect has to be distinguished from Gutnish (Gutamål), which is the autochthonous language on the islands and which was spoken well into the 20th century, it is estimated that around 2,000 to 5,000 people still speak Gutnish today. The Gotlandic dialect is characterized by a special singing language melody and by many diphthongs (like Gutnish), but is otherwise quite similar to standard Swedish in inflection and syntax. In contrast to Gutnish the Gotlandic dialect has fewer features in common with the Old Gutnish language.

The following table shows some differences between Gotlandic and Gutnish.

English	Standard Swedish	Gotlandic	Gutnish (Gutamål)
onion	lök	löyk	lauk
window	fönster	fönster	finster, finstur (Fårö)
It's foggy today.	Det är dimma idag	Det är dimme i dag.	Det är tuka i dag.

== Literature ==
- Gösta Bruce, Gösta: Vår fonetiska geografi: om svenskans accenter, melodi och uttal, Lund 2010, s. s. 183–187
- Fredrik Lindström: 100 svenska dialekter Stockholm 2019, s. 97–107 ISBN 9789174244656
