= Götaland dialects =

Dialect of Swedish

Geatish (Swedish: Götamål, lit. 'Geatish speech'; cf. Swedish to Sveamål) is one of the six dialect areas of the Swedish language, mostly heard in Västergötland, Dalsland, northern Halland, northern Småland and Östergötland. However, it is also heard in Bohuslän and Värmland. Examples of Götamål features are vowel reduction, vowel shortening in front of endings and loss of /r/ in suffixes, such as in hästa instead of hästar, eng. horses.

== See also ==
- Swedish language
- Swedish dialects
