= South Swedish dialects =

Linguistic Subgroup

South Swedish dialects (Swedish: sydsvenska mål) is one of the main dialect groups of Swedish. It includes the closely related dialects spoken in the formerly Danish but since 1658 Swedish traditional provinces of Scania (see Scanian dialects), Blekinge and southern Halland, as well as in the southern parts of Småland, which are the remains of an old dialect continuum between Danish and Swedish. The phonology of South Swedish dialects is influenced by Danish. Examples are the use of uvular trills (rather than alveolar trills) and "softening" of certain consonants.
