= Svealand dialects =

Swedish dialect

Svealand Swedish (Swedish: Sveamål) is one of the six major groupings of Swedish dialects, spoken in Svealand.

The Svealand Swedish dialects only have alveolar pronunciations of the rhotic, and no uvular pronunciations.

A major characteristic of Svealand Swedish is the coalescence of the alveolar trill with following dental and alveolar consonants—also over word-boundaries—that transforms them into retroflex consonants, which in some cases reduces the distinction between words (as for instance vana—varna, i.e. "habit"—"warn"). This feature is also found in East Norwegian, North Swedish and in some dialects of Scottish Gaelic.

- /r/ + /l/ → [ɭ]
- /r/ + /n/ → [ɳ]
- /r/ + /s/ → [ʂ]
- /r/ + /t/ → [ʈ]

A special development holds for rd:

- /r/ + /d/ → [ɽ]

The standard variety of Swedish, that of the capital region of Stockholm–Uppsala, is part of the Svealand dialect group, though /r/ + /d/ → [ɖ] is employed instead of the more typical transformation to a flap.
