= Swedish language =

North Germanic language

Swedish
- svenska
- Pronunciation: [ˈsvɛ̂nːska]
- Native to: Sweden, Finland, formerly Estonia
- Ethnicity: Swedes, Finland-Swedes
- Speakers: Native: 10 million (2012–2021); L2 speakers: 3 million
- Language family: Indo-European: Germanic; North Germanic; East Scandinavian; Swedish
- Early forms: Old Norse: Old East Norse; Old Swedish; Modern Swedish
- Writing system: Latin (Swedish alphabet); Swedish Braille
- Signed forms: Tecknad svenska (obsolete), Swedish Sign Language, Finland-Swedish Sign Language

Official status
- Official language in: Finland; Sweden; Åland; European Union; Nordic Council
- Regulated by: Swedish Language Council (in Sweden); Swedish Academy (in Sweden); Institute for the Languages of Finland (in Finland)

Language codes
- ISO 639-1: sv
- ISO 639-2: swe
- ISO 639-3: swe
- Glottolog: swed1254
- Linguasphere: 52-AAA-ck
- Regions where Swedish is an official language spoken by the majority of the population (Sweden, Åland, Western Finland); Regions where Swedish is an official language spoken by a minority of the population (Finland)

Swedish (endonym: svenska [ˈsvɛ̂nːska]) is a North Germanic language from the Indo-European language family, spoken predominantly in Sweden and parts of Finland. It has at least 10 million native speakers, making it the fourth most spoken Germanic language, and the first among its type in the Nordic countries overall.

Swedish, like the other Nordic languages, is a descendant of Old Norse, the common language of the Germanic peoples living in Scandinavia during the Viking Age. It is largely mutually intelligible with Norwegian and Danish, although the degree of mutual intelligibility is dependent on the dialect and accent of the speaker.

Standard Swedish, spoken by most Swedes, is the national language that evolved from the Central Swedish dialects in the 19th century, and was well established by the beginning of the 20th century. While distinct regional varieties and rural dialects still exist, the written language is uniform and standardized. In addition to being the native language of the Finland-Swedish minority, Swedish is the most widely spoken second language in Finland and has co-official language status in the country.

Swedish was long spoken in parts of Estonia, although the current status of the Estonian Swedish speakers is almost extinct. It is also used in the Swedish diaspora, most notably in Oslo, Norway, with more than 50,000 Swedish residents.

== Classification ==
Swedish is an Indo-European language belonging to the North Germanic branch of the Germanic languages. In the established classification, it belongs to the East Scandinavian languages, together with Danish, separating it from the West Scandinavian languages, consisting of Faroese, Icelandic, and Norwegian. However, more recent analyses divide the North Germanic languages into two groups: Insular Scandinavian (Faroese and Icelandic), and Continental Scandinavian (Danish, Norwegian, and Swedish), based on mutual intelligibility due to heavy influence of East Scandinavian (particularly Danish) on Norwegian during the last millennium and divergence from both Faroese and Icelandic.

By many general criteria of mutual intelligibility, the Continental Scandinavian languages could very well be considered dialects of a common Scandinavian language. However, because of several hundred years of sometimes quite intense rivalry between Denmark and Sweden, including a long series of wars from the 16th to 18th centuries, and the nationalist ideas that emerged during the late 19th and early 20th centuries, the languages have separate orthographies, dictionaries, grammars, and regulatory bodies. Danish, Norwegian, and Swedish are thus from a linguistic perspective more accurately described as a dialect continuum of Scandinavian (North Germanic), and some of the dialects, such as those on the border between Norway and Sweden, especially parts of Bohuslän, Dalsland, western Värmland, western Dalarna, Härjedalen, and Jämtland, could be described as intermediate dialects of the national standard languages.

Swedish pronunciations also vary greatly from one region to another, a legacy of the vast geographic distances and historical isolation. Even so, the vocabulary is standardized to a level that makes most dialects within Sweden virtually fully mutually intelligible.

- Proto-Germanic
  - East Germanic languages
  - West Germanic languages
  - Proto-Norse →
    - Old Norse
      - Old West Norse
        - Icelandic
        - Faroese
        - Norwegian
      - Old East Norse
        - Danish
        - Swedish

== History ==
=== Old Norse ===
The approximate extent of Old Norse and related languages in the early 10th century: Old West Norse dialect Old East Norse dialect Old Gutnish dialect Old English Crimean Gothic Other Germanic languages with which Old Norse still retained some mutual intelligibility

In the 8th century, the common Germanic language of Scandinavia, Proto-Norse, evolved into Old Norse. This language underwent more changes that did not spread to all of Scandinavia, which resulted in the appearance of two similar dialects: Old West Norse (Norway, the Faroe Islands and Iceland) and Old East Norse (Denmark and Sweden). The dialects of Old East Norse spoken in Sweden are called Runic Swedish, while the dialects of Denmark are referred to as Runic Danish. The dialects are described as "runic" because the main body of text appears in the runic alphabet. Unlike Proto-Norse, which was written with the Elder Futhark alphabet, Old Norse was written with the Younger Futhark alphabet, which had only 16 letters. Because the number of runes was limited, some runes were used for a range of phonemes, such as the rune for the vowel u, which was also used for the vowels o, ø and y, and the rune for i, also used for e.

From 1200 onwards, the dialects in Denmark began to diverge from those of Sweden. The innovations spread unevenly from Denmark, creating a series of minor dialectal boundaries, or isoglosses, ranging from Zealand in the south to Norrland, Österbotten and northwestern Finland in the north.

An early change that separated Runic Danish from the other dialects of Old East Norse was the change of the diphthong æi to the monophthong é, as in stæinn to sténn "stone". This is reflected in runic inscriptions where the older read stain and the later stin. There was also a change of au as in dauðr into a long open ø as in døðr "dead". This change is shown in runic inscriptions as a change from tauþr into tuþr. Moreover, the øy diphthong changed into a long, close ø, as in the Old Norse word for "island". By the end of the period, these innovations had affected most of the Runic Swedish-speaking area as well, with the exception of the dialects spoken north and east of Mälardalen where the diphthongs still exist in remote areas.

=== Old Swedish ===
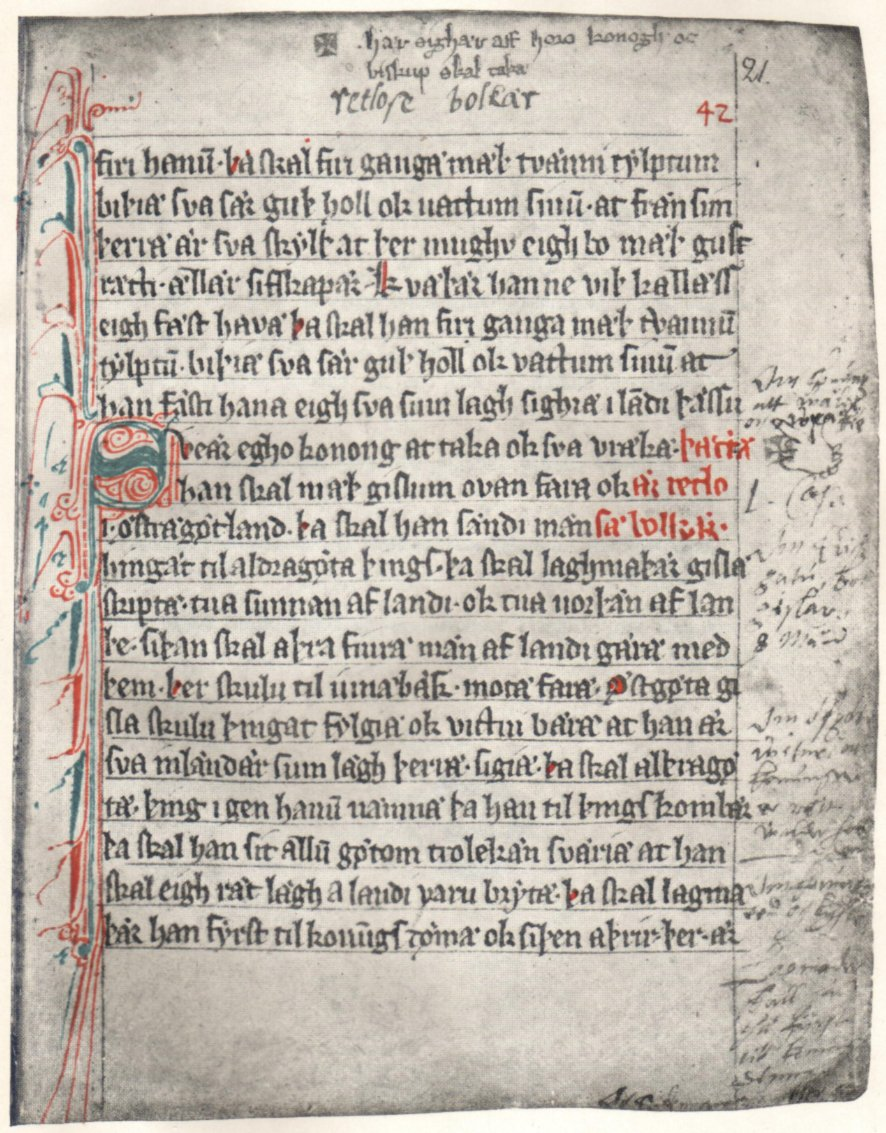
The initial page of the first complete copy of Västgötalagen, the law code of Västergötland, from c. 1280. It is one of the earliest texts in Swedish written in the Latin script.

Old Swedish (Swedish: fornsvenska) is the term used for the medieval Swedish language. The start date is usually set to 1225 since this is the year that Västgötalagen ("the Västgöta Law") is believed to have been compiled for the first time. It is among the most important documents of the period written in Latin script and the oldest Swedish law codes. Old Swedish is divided into äldre fornsvenska (1225–1375) and yngre fornsvenska (1375–1526), "older" and "younger" Old Swedish. Important outside influences during this time came with the firm establishment of the Christian church and various monastic orders, introducing many Greek and Latin loanwords. With the rise of Hanseatic power in the late 13th and early 14th century, Middle Low German became very influential. The Hanseatic league provided Swedish commerce and administration with a large number of Low German-speaking immigrants. Many became quite influential members of Swedish medieval society, and brought terms from their native languages into the vocabulary. Besides a great number of loanwords for such areas as warfare, trade and administration, general grammatical suffixes and even conjunctions were imported. The League also brought a certain measure of influence from Danish (at the time Swedish and Danish were much more similar than today).

Early Old Swedish was markedly different from the modern language in that it had a more complex case structure and also retained the original Germanic three-gender system. Nouns, adjectives, pronouns and certain numerals were inflected in four cases; besides the extant nominative, there were also the genitive (later possessive), dative and accusative. The gender system resembled that of modern German, having masculine, feminine and neuter genders. The masculine and feminine genders were later merged into a common gender with the definite suffix -en and the definite article den, in contrast with the neuter gender equivalents -et and det. The verb system was also more complex: it included subjunctive and imperative moods and verbs were conjugated according to person as well as number. By the 16th century, the case and gender systems of the colloquial spoken language and the profane literature had been largely reduced to the two cases and two genders of modern Swedish.

A transitional change of the Latin script in the Nordic countries was to spell the letter combination "ae" as æ – and sometimes as a' – though it varied between persons and regions. The combination "ao" was similarly rendered a^{o}, and "oe" became o^{e}. These three were later to evolve into the separate letters ä, å and ö. The first time the new letters were used in print was in Aff dyäffwlsens frästilse ("By the Devil's temptation") published by Johan Gerson in 1495.

=== Modern Swedish ===
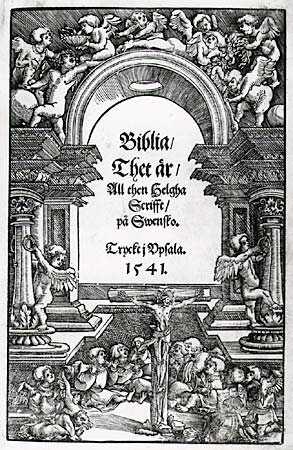
Front page of Gustav Vasa's Bible from 1541, using Fraktur. The title translated to English reads: "The Bible / That is / The Holy Scripture / in Swedish. Printed in Uppsala. 1541".

Modern Swedish (Swedish: nysvenska) begins with the advent of the printing press and the European Reformation. After assuming power, the new monarch Gustav Vasa ordered a Swedish translation of the Bible. The New Testament was published in 1526, followed by a full Bible translation in 1541, usually referred to as the Gustav Vasa Bible, a translation deemed so successful and influential that, with revisions incorporated in successive editions, it remained the most common Bible translation until 1917. The main translators were Laurentius Andreæ and the brothers Laurentius and Olaus Petri.

The Vasa Bible is often considered to be a reasonable compromise between old and new; while not adhering to the colloquial spoken language of its day, it was not overly conservative in its use of archaic forms. It was a major step towards a more consistent Swedish orthography. It established the use of the vowels "å", "ä", and "ö", and the spelling "ck" in place of "kk", distinguishing it clearly from the Danish Bible, perhaps intentionally, given the ongoing rivalry between the countries. All three translators came from central Sweden, which is generally seen as adding specific Central Swedish features to the new Bible.

Though it might seem as if the Bible translation set a very powerful precedent for orthographic standards, spelling actually became more inconsistent during the remainder of the century. It was not until the 17th century that spelling began to be discussed, around the time when the first grammars were written. Capitalization during this time was not standardized. It depended on the authors and their background. Those influenced by German capitalized all nouns, while others capitalized more sparsely. It is also not always apparent which letters are capitalized owing to the Gothic or blackletter typeface that was used to print the Bible. This typeface was in use until the mid-18th century, when it was gradually replaced with a Latin typeface (often Antiqua).

Some important changes in sound during the Modern Swedish period were the gradual assimilation of several different consonant clusters into the fricative [ʃ] and later into [ɧ]. There was also the gradual softening of [ɡ] and [k] into [j] and the fricative [ɕ] before front vowels. The velar fricative [ɣ] was also transformed into the corresponding plosive [ɡ].

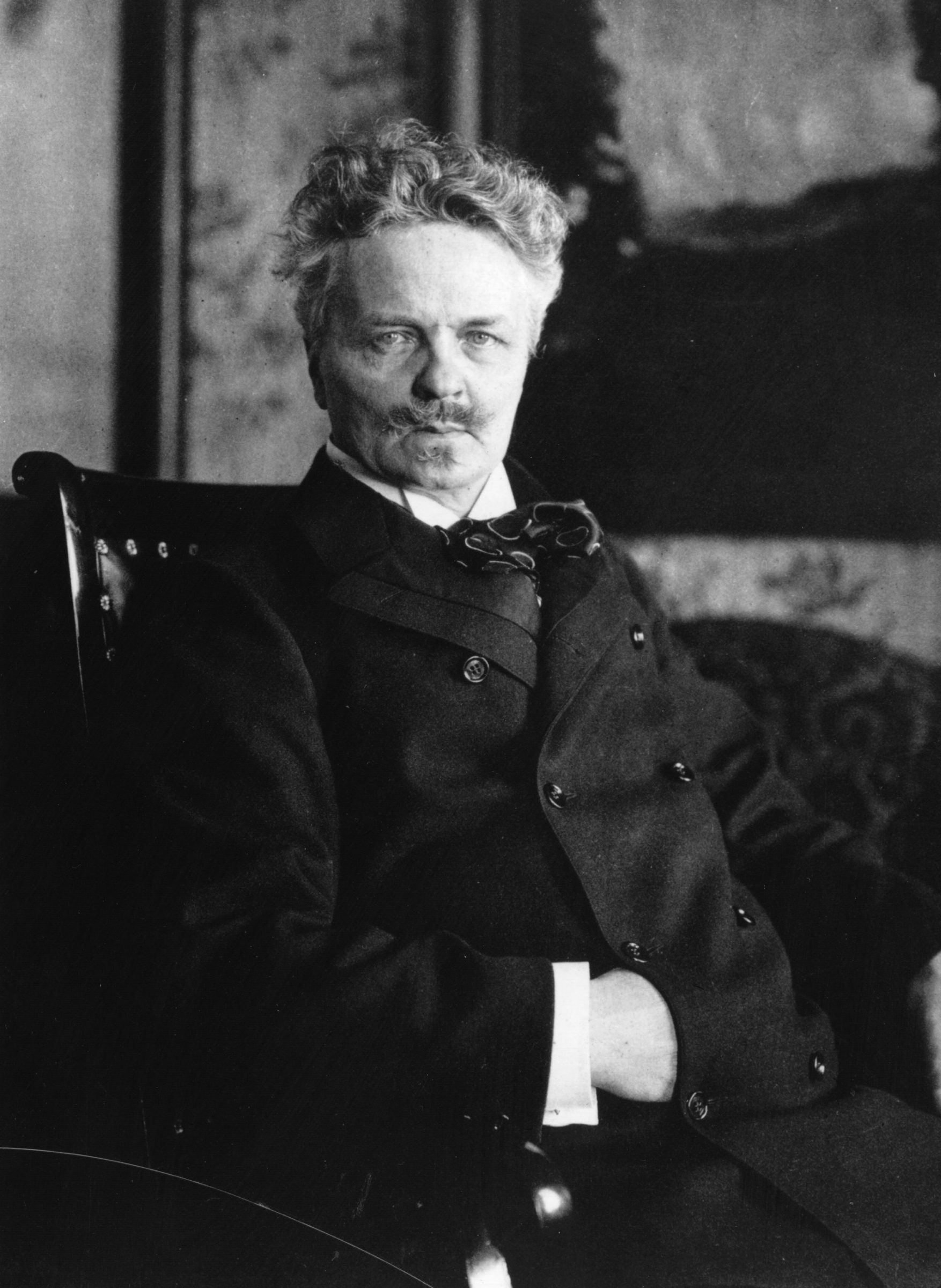
August Strindberg, one of the most influential writers in modern Swedish literature

=== Contemporary Swedish ===
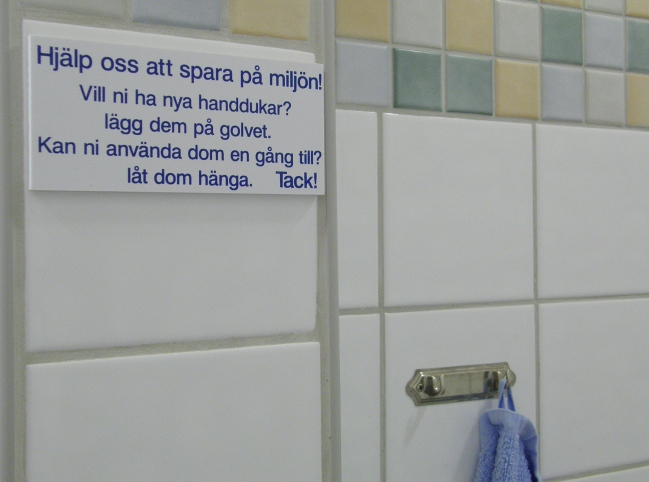
A sign on the wall of a Swedish hotel, using both the recommended dem and the colloquial dom for the word "them" on the same sign.

The period that includes Swedish as it is spoken today is termed nusvenska (lit., "Now-Swedish") in linguistics, and started in the last decades of the 19th century. It saw a democratization of the language with a less formal written form that approached the spoken one. The growth of a state school system also led to the evolution of so-called boksvenska (literally, "Book Swedish"), especially among the working classes, where spelling to some extent influenced pronunciation, particularly in official contexts. With the industrialization and urbanization of Sweden well under way by the last decades of the 19th century, a new breed of authors made their mark on Swedish literature. Many scholars, politicians and other public figures had a great influence on the emerging national language, among them prolific authors like the poet Gustaf Fröding, Nobel laureate Selma Lagerlöf and radical writer and playwright August Strindberg. In Finland, Finland-Swedish literature emerged as a separate branch.

It was during the 20th century that a common, standardized national language became available to all Swedes. The orthography finally stabilized and became almost completely uniform, with some minor deviations, by the time of the spelling reform of 1906. With the exception of plural forms of verbs and a slightly different syntax, particularly in the written language, the language was the same as the Swedish of today. The plural verb forms appeared decreasingly in formal writing into the 1950s, when their use was removed from all official recommendations.

A very significant change in Swedish occurred in the late 1960s with the so-called du-reformen. Previously the proper way to address people of the same or higher social status had been by title and surname. The use of herr ("Mr" or "Sir"), fru ("Mrs" or "Ma'am") or fröken ("Miss") was considered the only acceptable way to begin conversation with strangers of unknown occupation, academic title or military rank. The fact that the listener should preferably be referred to in the third person tended to further complicate spoken communication between members of society. In the early 20th century an unsuccessful attempt was made to replace the insistence on titles with ni—the standard second person plural pronoun)—analogous to the French vous (see T-V distinction). Ni wound up being used as a slightly less familiar form of du, the second person singular pronoun, used to address people of lower social status. With the liberalization and radicalization of Swedish society in the 1950s and 1960s, these class distinctions became less important and du became the standard, even in formal and official contexts. Though the reform was not an act of any centralized political decree but rather the result of sweeping change in social attitudes, it was completed in just a few years, from the late 1960s to early 1970s. The use of ni as a polite form of address is sometimes encountered today in both the written and spoken language, particularly among older speakers.

== Geographic distribution ==
Swedish is the sole official national language of Sweden, and one of two in Finland (alongside Finnish). As of 2006, it was the sole native language of 83% of Swedish residents. In 2007, around 5.5% (c. 290,000) of the population of Finland were native speakers of Swedish, partially due to a decline following the Russian annexation of Finland after the Finnish War 1808–1809. The Fenno-Swedish-speaking minority is concentrated in the coastal areas and archipelagos of southern and western Finland. In some of these areas, Swedish is the predominant language; in 19 municipalities, 16 of which are located in Åland, Swedish is the sole official language. Åland county is an autonomous region of Finland.

According to a rough estimation, as of 2010 there were up to 300,000 Swedish-speakers living outside Sweden and Finland. The largest populations were in the United States (up to 100,000), the UK, Spain and Germany (c. 30,000 each) and a large proportion of the remaining 100,000 in the Scandinavian countries, France, Switzerland, Belgium, the Netherlands, Canada and Australia. Over three million people speak Swedish as a second language, with about 2,410,000 of those in Finland. According to a survey by the European Commission, 44% of respondents from Finland who did not have Swedish as a native language considered themselves to be proficient enough in Swedish to hold a conversation. Due to the close relation between the Scandinavian languages, a considerable proportion of speakers of Danish and especially Norwegian are able to understand Swedish.

There is considerable migration between the Nordic countries, but owing to the similarity between the cultures and languages (with the exception of Finnish), expatriates generally assimilate quickly and do not stand out as a group. According to the 2000 United States Census, some 67,000 people over the age of five were reported as Swedish speakers, though without any information on the degree of language proficiency. Similarly, there were 16,915 reported Swedish speakers in Canada from the 2001 census. Although there are no certain numbers, some 40,000 Swedes are estimated to live in the London area in the United Kingdom. Outside Sweden and Finland, there are about 40,000 active learners enrolled in Swedish language courses.

In the United States, particularly during the 19th and early 20th centuries, there was a significant Swedish-speaking immigrant population. This was notably true in states like Minnesota, where many Swedish immigrants settled. By 1940, approximately 6% of Minnesota's population spoke Swedish. Although the use of Swedish has significantly declined, it is not uncommon to find older generations and communities that still retain some use and knowledge of the language, particularly in rural communities like Lindström and Scandia.

=== Official status ===
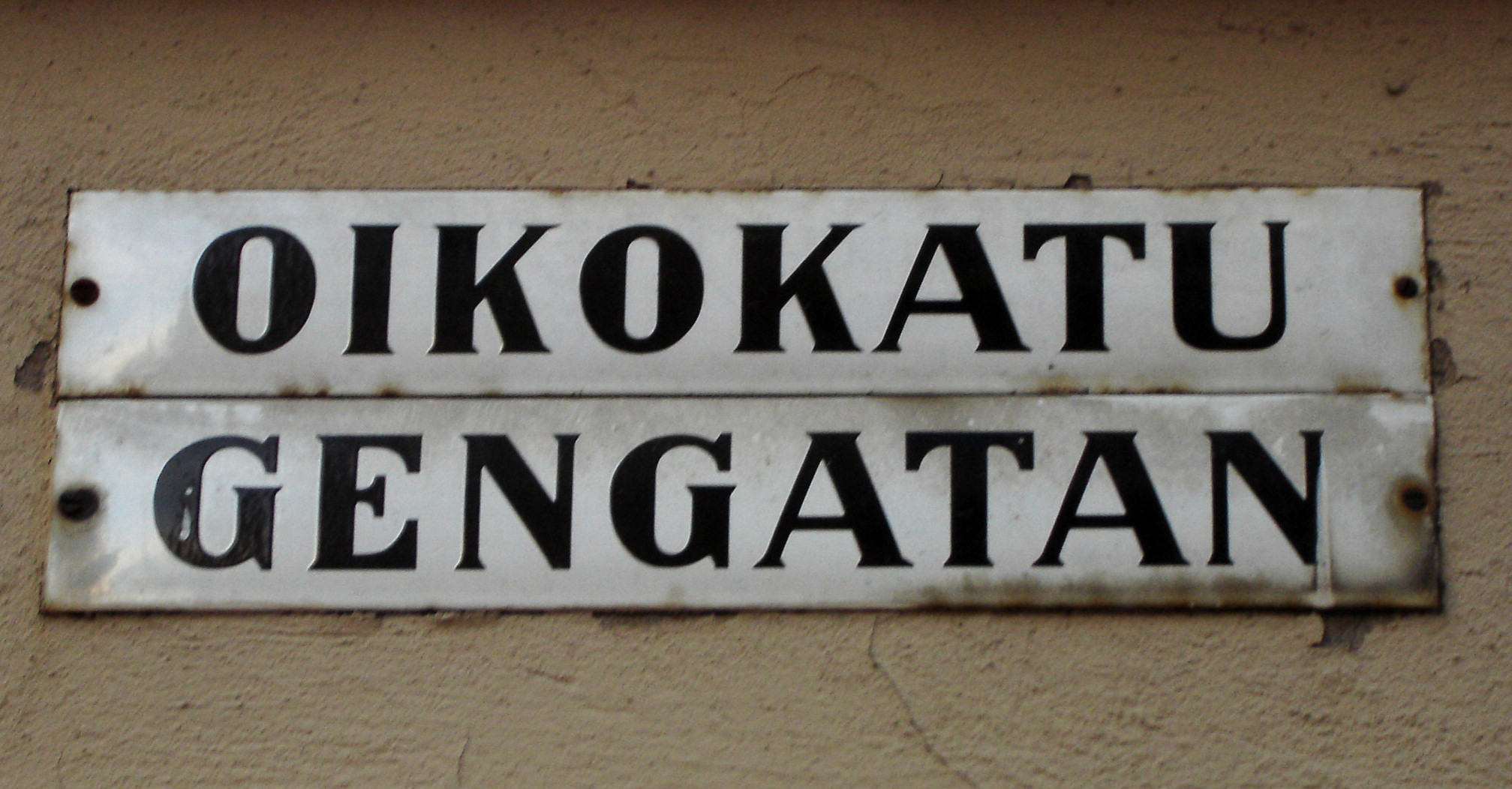
A Finnish/Swedish street sign in Helsinki, Finland

Swedish is the official main language of Sweden. Swedish is also one of two official languages of Finland. In Sweden, it has long been used in local and state government, and most of the educational system, but remained only a de facto primary language with no official status in law until 2009. A bill was proposed in 2005 that would have made Swedish an official language, but failed to pass by the narrowest possible margin (145–147) due to a pairing-off failure. A proposal for a broader language law, designating Swedish as the main language of the country and bolstering the status of the minority languages, was submitted by an expert committee to the Swedish Ministry of Culture in March 2008. It was subsequently enacted by the Riksdag, and entered into effect on 1 July 2009.

Swedish is the sole official language of Åland (an autonomous province under the sovereignty of Finland), where the vast majority of the 26,000 inhabitants speak Swedish as a first language. In Finland as a whole, Swedish is one of the two "national" languages, with the same official status as Finnish (spoken by the majority) at the state level and an official language in some municipalities.

Swedish is one of the official languages of the European Union, and one of the working languages of the Nordic Council. Under the Nordic Language Convention, citizens of the Nordic countries speaking Swedish have the opportunity to use their native language when interacting with official bodies in other Nordic countries without being liable for interpretation or translation costs.

=== Regulatory bodies ===
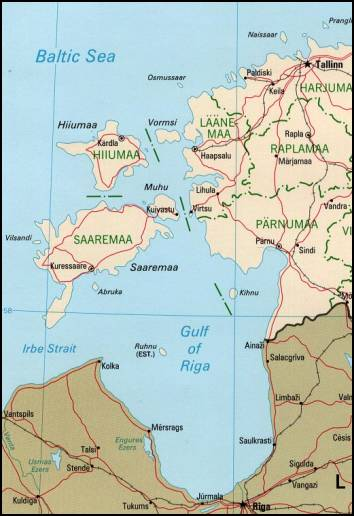
Map of the Estonian islands, which formerly housed "Coastal Swede" populations

The Swedish Language Council (Språkrådet) is the regulator of Swedish in Sweden but does not attempt to enforce control of the language, as for instance the Académie française does for French. However, many organizations and agencies require the use of the council's publication Svenska skrivregler in official contexts, with it otherwise being regarded as a de facto orthographic standard. Among the many organizations that make up the Swedish Language Council, the Swedish Academy (established 1786) is arguably the most influential. Its primary instruments are the spelling dictionary Svenska Akademiens ordlista (SAOL, currently in its 14th edition) and the dictionary Svenska Akademiens Ordbok, in addition to various books on grammar, spelling and manuals of style. Although the dictionaries have a prescriptive element, they mainly describe current usage.

In Finland, a special branch of the Research Institute for the Languages of Finland has official status as the regulatory body for Swedish in Finland. Among its highest priorities is to maintain intelligibility with the language spoken in Sweden. It has published Finlandssvensk ordbok, a dictionary about the differences between Swedish in Finland and Sweden.

=== Language minorities in Estonia and Ukraine ===
From the 13th to 20th century, there were Swedish-speaking communities in Estonia, particularly on the islands (e. g., Hiiumaa, Vormsi, Ruhnu; in Swedish, known as Dagö, Ormsö, Runö, respectively) along the coast of the Baltic, communities that today have all disappeared. The Swedish-speaking minority was represented in parliament, and entitled to use their native language in parliamentary debates. After the loss of Estonia to the Russian Empire in the early 18th century, around 1,000 Estonian Swedish speakers were forced to march to southern Ukraine, where they founded a village, Gammalsvenskby ("Old Swedish Village"). A few elderly people in the village still speak a Swedish dialect and observe the holidays of the Swedish calendar, although their dialect is most likely facing extinction.

From 1918 to 1940, when Estonia was independent, the small Swedish community was well treated. Municipalities with a Swedish majority, mainly found along the coast, used Swedish as the administrative language and Swedish-Estonian culture saw an upswing. However, most Swedish-speaking people fled to Sweden before the end of World War II, that is before the invasion of Estonia by the Soviet army in 1944. Only a handful of speakers remain.

== Phonology ==
The vowel phonemes of Central Standard Swedish

Swedish dialects have either 17 or 18 vowel phonemes, 9 long and 9 short. As in the other Germanic languages, including English, most long vowels are phonetically paired with one of the short vowels, and the pairs are such that the two vowels are of similar quality, but with the short vowel being slightly lower and slightly centralized. In contrast to, for example, Danish, which has only tense vowels, the short vowels are slightly more lax, but the tense vs. lax contrast is not nearly as pronounced as in English, German or Dutch. In many dialects, the short vowel sound pronounced [ɛ] or [æ] has merged with the short /e/ (transcribed ⟨ɛ⟩ in the chart below).

There are 18 consonant phonemes, two of which, /ɧ/ and /r/, vary considerably in pronunciation depending on the dialect and social status of the speaker. In many dialects, sequences of /r/ (pronounced alveolarly) with a dental consonant result in retroflex consonants; alveolarity of the pronunciation of /r/ is a precondition for this retroflexion. /r/ has a guttural or "French R" pronunciation in the South Swedish dialects; consequently, these dialects lack retroflex consonants.

Swedish is a stress-timed language, where the time intervals between stressed syllables are equal. However, when casually spoken, it tends to be syllable-timed. Any stressed syllable carries one of two tones, which gives Swedish much of its characteristic sound. Prosody is often one of the most noticeable differences between dialects.

Place Manner		Labial	Dental/ Alveolar	Palatal	Velar	Glottal
Nasal		m	n		ŋ	
Plosive	voiceless	p	t		k	
Plosive	voiced	b	d		ɡ	
Continuant	voiceless	f	s	ɕ	ɧ	h
Continuant	voiced	v	l	j		
Rhotic			r			

== Grammar ==
The standard word order is, as in most Germanic languages, V2, which means that the finite verb (V) appears in the second position (2) of a declarative main clause. Swedish morphology is similar to English; that is, words have comparatively few inflections. Swedish has two genders and is generally seen to have two grammatical cases – nominative and genitive (except for pronouns that, as in English, are also inflected in the object form) – although it is debated if the genitive in Swedish should be seen as a genitive case or just the nominative plus the so-called genitive s, then seen as a clitic. Swedish has two grammatical numbers – plural and singular. Adjectives have discrete comparative and superlative forms and are also inflected according to gender, number and definiteness. The definiteness of nouns is marked primarily through suffixes (endings), complemented with separate definite and indefinite articles. The prosody features both stress and in most dialects tonal qualities. The language has a comparatively large vowel inventory. Swedish is also notable for the voiceless dorso-palatal velar fricative, a highly variable consonant phoneme.

Swedish nouns and adjectives are declined in genders as well as number. Nouns are of common gender (en form) or neuter gender (ett form).

Swedish used to have a genitive that was placed at the end of the head of a noun phrase. In modern Swedish, it has become an enclitic -s, which attaches to the end of the noun phrase, rather than the noun itself.

hästen; "the horse" – hästens "the horse's"
hästen på den blommande ängens svarta man; "the horse in the flowering meadow's black mane"

In formal written language, it used to be considered correct to place the genitive -s after the head of the noun phrase (hästen), though this is today considered dated, and different grammatical constructions are often used.

Verbs are conjugated according to tense. One group of verbs (the ones ending in -er in present tense) has a special imperative form (generally the verb stem), but with most verbs the imperative is identical to the infinitive form. Perfect and present participles as adjectival verbs are very common:

Perfect participle: en stekt fisk; "a fried fish" (steka = to fry)
Present participle: en stinkande fisk; "a stinking fish" (stinka = to stink)

In contrast to English and many other languages, Swedish does not use the perfect participle to form the present perfect and past perfect. Rather, the auxiliary verb har ("have"), hade ("had") is followed by a special form, called the supine, used solely for this purpose (although often identical to the neuter form of the perfect participle):

Perfect participle: målad, "painted" – supine målat, present perfect har målat; "have painted"
Perfect participle: stekt, "fried" – supine stekt, present perfect har stekt; "have fried"
Perfect participle: skriven, "written" – supine skrivit, present perfect har skrivit; "have written"

When building the compound passive voice using the verb att bli, the past participle is used:

den blir målad; "it's being painted"
den blev målad; "it was painted"

There exists also an inflected passive voice formed by adding -s, replacing the final r in the present tense:

den målas; "it's being painted"
den målades; "it was painted"

In a subordinate clause, the auxiliary har is optional and often omitted, particularly in written Swedish.

Jag ser att han (har) stekt fisken; "I see that he has fried the fish"

Subjunctive mood is occasionally used for some verbs, but its use is in sharp decline and few speakers perceive the handful of commonly used verbs (as for instance: vore, månne) as separate conjugations, most of them remaining only as set of idiomatic expressions.

Where other languages may use grammatical cases, Swedish uses numerous prepositions, similar to those found in English. As in modern German, prepositions formerly determined case in Swedish, but this feature can only be found in certain idiomatic expressions like till fots ("on foot", genitive).

As Swedish is a Germanic language, the syntax shows similarities to both English and German. Like English, Swedish has a subject–verb–object basic word order, but like German it utilizes verb-second word order in main clauses, for instance after adverbs and adverbial phrases, and dependent clauses. (Adverbial phrases denoting time are usually placed at the beginning of a main clause that is at the head of a sentence.) Prepositional phrases are placed in a place–manner–time order, as in English (but not German). Adjectives precede the noun they modify. Verb-second (inverted) word order is also used for questions.

== Vocabulary ==
The vocabulary of Swedish is mainly Germanic, either through common Germanic heritage or through loans from German, Middle Low German, and to some extent, English. Examples of Germanic words in Swedish are mus ("mouse"), kung ("king"), and gås ("goose"). A significant part of the religious and scientific vocabulary is of Latin or Greek origin, often borrowed from French and, lately, English. Some 1–200 words are also borrowed from Scandoromani or Romani, often as slang varieties; a commonly used word from Romani is tjej ("girl").

A large number of French words were imported into Sweden around the 18th century. These words have been transcribed to the Swedish spelling system and are therefore pronounced recognizably to a French-speaker. Most of them are distinguished by a "French accent", characterized by emphasis on the last syllable. For example, nivå (fr. niveau, "level"), fåtölj (fr. fauteuil, "armchair") and affär ("shop; affair"), etc. Cross-borrowing from other Germanic languages has also been common, at first from Middle Low German, the lingua franca of the Hanseatic league and later from Standard German. Some compounds are translations of the elements (calques) of German original compounds into Swedish, like bomull from German Baumwolle ("cotton"; literally, tree-wool).

As with many Germanic languages, new words can be formed by compounding, e. g., nouns like nagellackborttagningsmedel ("nail polish remover") or verbs like smyglyssna ("to eavesdrop"). Compound nouns take their gender from the head, which in Swedish is always the last morpheme. New words can also be coined by derivation from other established words, such as the verbification of nouns by the adding of the suffix -a, as in bil ("car") and bila ("travel (recreationally) by car"). The opposite, making nouns of verbs, is also possible, as in tänk ("way of thinking; concept") from tänka ("to think").

== Writing system ==
The Swedish alphabet is a 29-letter alphabet, using the 26-letter ISO basic Latin alphabet plus the three additional letters ⟨å⟩, ⟨ä⟩, and ⟨ö⟩ constructed in the 16th century by writing ⟨o⟩ and ⟨e⟩ on top of an ⟨a⟩, and an ⟨e⟩ on top of an ⟨o⟩. Though these combinations are historically modified versions of ⟨a⟩ and ⟨o⟩ according to the English range of usage for the term diacritic, these three characters are not considered to be diacritics within the Swedish application, but rather separate letters, and are independent letters following ⟨z⟩. Before the release of the 13th edition of Svenska Akademiens ordlista in April 2006, ⟨w⟩ was treated as merely a variant of ⟨v⟩ used only in names (such as "Wallenberg") and foreign words ("bowling"), and so was both sorted and pronounced as a ⟨v⟩. Other diacritics (to use the broader English term usage referenced here) are unusual in Swedish; ⟨é⟩ is sometimes used to indicate that the stress falls on a terminal syllable containing ⟨e⟩, especially when the stress changes the meaning (ide vs. idé, "winter lair" vs. "idea") as well as in some names, like Kastrén; occasionally other acute accents and, less often, grave accents can be seen in names and some foreign words. The letter ⟨à⟩ is used to refer to unit cost (a loan from the French), equivalent to the at sign (⟨@⟩) in English.

The German ⟨ü⟩ is treated as a variant of ⟨y⟩ and sometimes retained in foreign names and words, e. g., müsli ("muesli/granola"). A proper diaeresis may very exceptionally be seen in elaborated style (for instance: "Aïda"). The German convention of writing ⟨ä⟩ and ⟨ö⟩ as ⟨ae⟩ and ⟨oe⟩ if the characters are unavailable is an unusual convention for speakers of modern Swedish. Despite the availability of all these characters in the Swedish national top-level Internet domain and other such domains, Swedish sites are frequently labelled using ⟨a⟩ and ⟨o⟩, based on visual similarity, though Swedish domains could be registered using the characters ⟨å⟩, ⟨ä⟩, and ⟨ö⟩ from 2003.

In Swedish orthography, the colon is used in a similar manner as in English, with some exceptions: the colon is used for some abbreviations, such as 3:e for tredje ("third") and S:t for Sankt ("Saint"), and for all types of endings that can be added to numbers, letters and abbreviations, such as a:et ("the a") and CD:n ("the CD"), or the genitive form USA:s ("USA's").

== Dialects ==
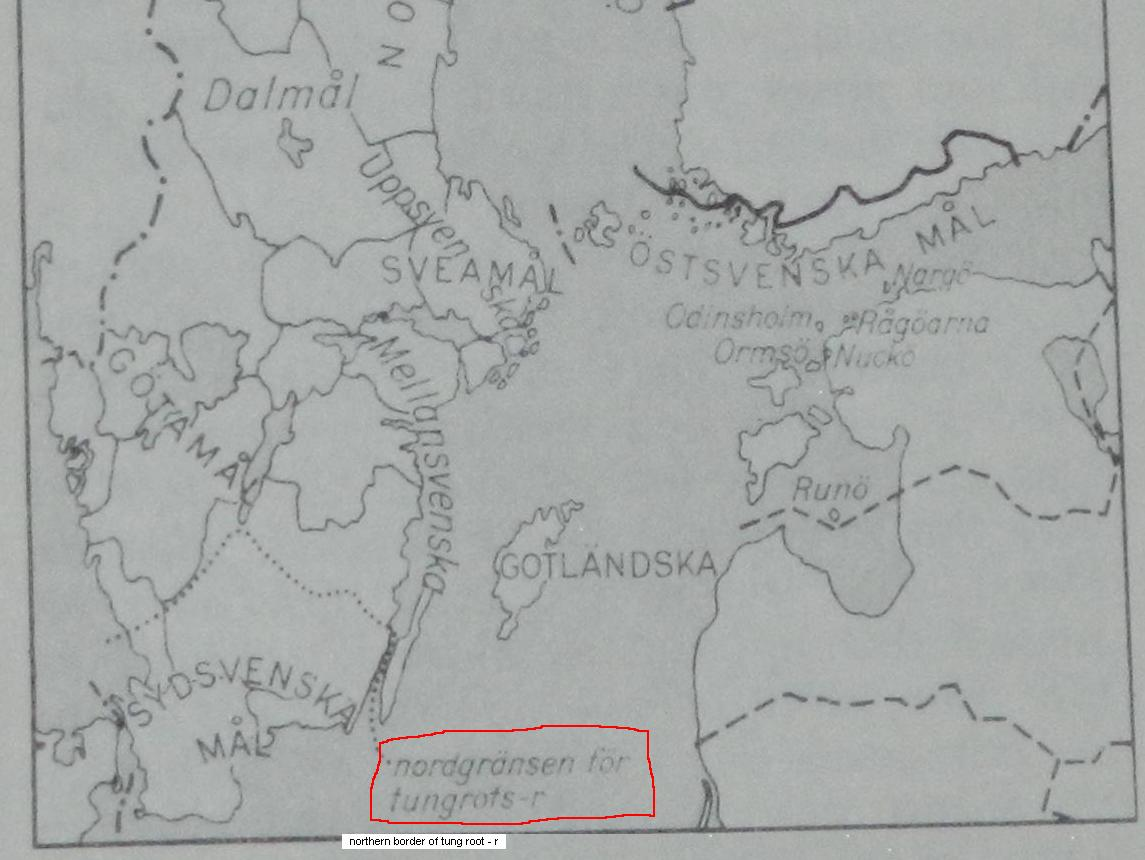
Isogloss for the pronunciation of "R" (c. 1960), being alveolar north of the boundary and uvular ("French R") south of it. It follows that the R+S combination is pronounced as spelled south of the boundary, while pronounced [ʂ] (similar to "sh" in "shark") north of it. This isogloss is the most imperative of all Swedish pronunciation differences.

According to a traditional division of Swedish dialects, there are six main groups of dialects:

- Norrland dialects
- Finland Swedish
- Svealand dialects
- Gotland dialects
- Götaland dialects
- South Swedish dialects

The traditional definition of a Swedish dialect has been a local variant that has not been heavily influenced by the standard language and that can trace a separate development all the way back to Old Norse. Many of the genuine rural dialects, such as those of Orsa in Dalarna or Närpes in Österbotten, have very distinct phonetic and grammatical features, such as plural forms of verbs or archaic case inflections. These dialects can be near-incomprehensible to a majority of Swedes, and most of their speakers are also fluent in Standard Swedish. The different dialects are often so localized that they are limited to individual parishes and are referred to by Swedish linguists as sockenmål (lit., "parish speech"). They are generally separated into six major groups, with common characteristics of prosody, grammar and vocabulary. One or several examples from each group are given here. Though each example is intended to be also representative of the nearby dialects, the actual number of dialects is several hundred if each individual community is considered separately.

This type of classification, however, is based on a somewhat romanticized nationalist view of ethnicity and language. The idea that only rural variants of Swedish should be considered "genuine" is not generally accepted by modern scholars. No dialects, no matter how remote or obscure, remained unchanged or undisturbed by a minimum of influences from surrounding dialects or the standard language, especially not from the late 19th century onwards with the advent of mass media and advanced forms of transport. The differences are today more accurately described by a scale that runs from "standard language" to "rural dialect" where the speech even of the same person may vary from one extreme to the other depending on the situation. All Swedish dialects with the exception of the highly diverging forms of speech in Dalarna, Norrbotten and, to some extent, Gotland can be considered to be part of a common, mutually intelligible dialect continuum. This continuum may also include Norwegian and some Danish dialects.

=== Standard Swedish ===
Standard Swedish is the language used by virtually all Swedes and most Swedish-speaking Finns. It is called rikssvenska or standardsvenska ("Standard Swedish") in Sweden. In Finland, högsvenska ("High Swedish") is used for the Finnish variant of standard Swedish and rikssvenska refers to Swedish as spoken in Sweden in general.

In a poll conducted in 2005 by the Swedish Retail Institute (Handelns Utredningsinstitut), the attitudes of Swedes to the use of certain dialects by salesmen revealed that 54% believed that rikssvenska was the variety they would prefer to hear when speaking with salesmen over the phone, even though dialects such as gotländska or skånska were provided as alternatives in the poll.

=== Finland Swedish ===
Finland was a part of Sweden from the 13th century until the loss of the Finnish territories to Russia in 1809. Swedish was the sole administrative language until 1902 as well as the dominant language of culture and education until Finnish independence in 1917. The percentage of Swedish speakers in Finland has steadily decreased since then. The Swedish-speaking population is mainly concentrated in the coastal areas of Ostrobothnia, Southwest Finland and Uusimaa where the percentage of Finland Swedes is high, with Swedish being spoken by more than 90% of the population in several municipalities, and on Åland, where Swedish is spoken by a vast majority of the population and is the only official language. Swedish is an official language also in the rest of Finland, though, with the same official status as Finnish. The country's public broadcaster, Yle, provides two Swedish-language radio stations, Yle Vega and Yle X3M, as well a TV channel, Yle Fem.

=== Immigrant variants ===
Rinkeby Swedish (after Rinkeby, a suburb of northern Stockholm with a large immigrant population) is a common name among linguists for varieties of Swedish spoken by young people of foreign heritage in certain suburbs and urban districts in the major cities of Stockholm, Gothenburg and Malmö. These varieties could alternatively be classified as sociolects, because the immigrant dialects share common traits independent of their geographical spread or the native country of the speakers. However, some studies have found distinctive features and led to terms such as Rosengård Swedish (after Rosengård in Malmö), a variant of Scanian. A survey made by the Swedish linguist Ulla-Britt Kotsinas showed that foreign learners had difficulties in guessing the origins of Rinkeby Swedish speakers in Stockholm. The greatest difficulty proved to be identifying the speech of a boy speaking Rinkeby Swedish whose parents were both Swedish; only 1.8% guessed his native language correctly.

New linguistic practices in multilingual urban contexts in fiction and hip-hop culture and rap lyrics have been introduced that go beyond traditional socio-linguistic domains. See also Källström (Chapter 12) and Knudsen (Chapter 13).

== Sample ==
Universal Declaration of Human Rights in Swedish

Article 1 of the Universal Declaration of Human Rights in Swedish:

Alla människor är födda fria och lika i värdighet och rättigheter. De har utrustats med förnuft och samvete och bör handla gentemot varandra i en anda av gemenskap.

Article 1 of the Universal Declaration of Human Rights in English:

All human beings are born free and equal in dignity and rights. They are endowed with reason and conscience and should act towards one another in a spirit of brotherhood.

Excerpt from Barfotabarn (1933), by Nils Ferlin (1898–1961):

Original	Free, prosaic translation
Du har tappat ditt ord och din papperslapp,	"You have lost your word and your paper note,
du barfotabarn i livet.	you barefooted child in life.
Så sitter du åter på handlar'ns trapp	So you sit on the porch of the grocer anew
och gråter så övergivet.	and cry so abandoned.
Vad var det för ord – var det långt eller kort,	What word was it – was it long or short,
var det väl eller illa skrivet?	was it well or poorly written?
Tänk efter nu – förr'n vi föser dig bort,	Think twice now – before we shove you away,
du barfotabarn i livet.	you barefooted child in life."

== See also ==
- Languages of Sweden
- Languages of Finland
- Swedish as a foreign language
- Swenglish
