= Standard Swedish =

Standard form of written and spoken Swedish

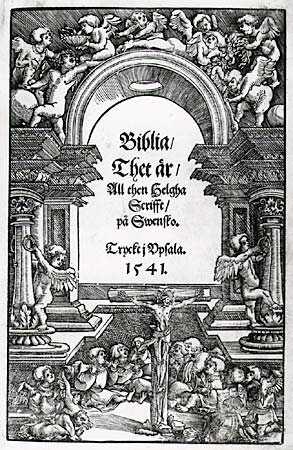
The printed Bible during King Gustav Vasa of Sweden, c. 1541

Standard Swedish (standardsvenska, rikssvenska, högsvenska) denotes Swedish as a spoken and written standard language. While Swedish as a written language is uniform and standardized, the spoken standard may vary considerably from region to region. Several prestige dialects have developed around the major urban centers of Stockholm, Helsinki, Gothenburg and Malmö–Lund.

== Rikssvenska and högsvenska ==
In Swedish, the terms rikssvenska "Realm Swedish" and högsvenska "High Swedish" are used in Sweden and Finland respectively, particularly by non-linguists, and both terms are ambiguous. The direct translation of standardsvenska "Standard Swedish" is less common and primarily used in scholarly contexts.

In certain (mostly Finland-related) contexts, rikssvenska has come to mean all Swedish as spoken in Sweden as opposed to the Finland Swedish, finlandssvenska, spoken in Finland or Estonian Swedish spoken in Estonia. For speakers in Sweden, the term, however often, perhaps primarily, indicates "non-dialectal" (spoken) Swedish. The term "Sweden Swedish" (sverigesvenska) is sometimes used instead, as a parallel to the term Finland Swedish. There is, however, no common agreement on how rikssvenska should sound. What appears as rikssvenska to one Swede may appear dialectal to another. (Etymologically, "riks-" is a compound form that is a cognate of the German Reich.)

National Swedish television and radio news broadcasts that are often produced in Stockholm have historically preferred commentators who speak what is seen as rikssvenska, but that has gradually been relaxed.

The definition of högsvenska (literally "High Swedish") was formerly the same as for rikssvenska, the most prestigious dialect spoken in (the capital of) Sweden. During the 20th century, its meaning changed, and it now denotes the prestige dialect of the Swedish speakers in Helsinki.

Until the late 19th or the early 20th century, Swedish was the primary language of status, government and education in Finland although it was spoken as a first language by only a relatively small minority. Since the 1970s, both domestic languages have been mandatory subjects for all Finnish pupils in primary and secondary schools, but the requirement to include Swedish in the upper-secondary final examination ("studentexamen") was dropped in 2004. Certified knowledge of Swedish language is still mandatory for government officials, and therefore most University degrees require studies in both oral and written Swedish. Most universities teach Finnish Swedish for this purpose, but some universities, like Tampere University, have opted to teach Standard Swedish (rikssvenska), and despite minor differences in vocabulary etc. both are seen as equals for this purpose.

== Regional standards and rural dialects ==
Swedish linguists reserve the term "dialect" for rural dialects with roots that can be traced back to Old Swedish. However, among Swedish speakers in general, other regional standards are considered to be "dialects".

Although Swedish phonology is theoretically uniform, its phonetic realizations are not. Contrary to the situation in Danish, Finnish or German (with three national standards for Germany, Austria and Switzerland) there is no single standard for spoken Swedish. There are several regional varieties (acrolects or prestige dialects) that are used in official contexts.

The major regional variants include those of South Sweden (based on South Swedish dialects), Western Sweden (centered on Gothenburg), Central Sweden (centered on the capital of Stockholm) and Northern Sweden (based on Norrland dialects). There is also a separate standard for Swedish in Finland based on Finland Swedish. Several dialects occur in broadcast media in Sweden, but the Central Swedish variant dominates and is often perceived as more "standardized" and more neutral than the others.

== Official status ==
Swedish became Sweden's main official language on July 1, 2009, when a new language law was implemented. The issue of whether Swedish should be declared the official language has been raised in the past, and the parliament voted on the matter in 2005 but the proposal narrowly failed. The Swedish language also has official status in Finland (including the autonomous region of Åland), but no officially sanctioned standard actually exists. However, the Institute for the Languages of Finland has the purpose of language planning and dictionary compilation.

In Sweden, the Swedish Language Council is similarly funded by the Swedish government and may be said to have a semiofficial status as a regulatory body being a joint effort that includes the Swedish Academy, Swedish Radio, Swedish Broadcasting Corporation and several other organizations representing journalists, teachers, actors, writers and translators. The recommendations of those bodies are not legally binding but are generally respected.

== History ==
=== Sweden ===
Standard Swedish evolved from the high prestige dialects of the Mälaren Valley region around Stockholm, the capital of Sweden.

In Sweden, the concept of a unified standard language, based on a high prestige dialect spoken in the capital region, was primarily understood in terms of the written language, as exemplified with the Swedification of the Danish and Norwegian provinces that were acquired in the 17th century. The people were taught Swedish hymns and prayers but with a phonology that remained largely Danish or Norwegian.

During the second half of the 19th century, the use of a standardised written language increased with each new method of communication and transportation. It was, however, only in the 1960s that the major demographic situation of Sweden had changed from a quite rural and agrarian society to today's highly-urbanized society, when the spoken varieties converged towards unified dialects whose vocabulary and grammatical rules adhered to that of the written Standard Swedish. The different phonologies, particularly the different realizations of the tonal word accents, have remained more varied.

With respect to other aspects of the spoken language, there are developments towards a unification that is not always the effect of standardisation or convergence. For instance, the fricatives in Central Standard Swedish have undergone a change in recent decades toward those of Southern Swedish, than those of Northern Sweden and Finland.

=== Finland ===
The creation of the autonomous Russian Grand Duchy of Finland in 1809 drastically decreased communication between Sweden and Finland, but Swedish remained the language of administration and higher education until Finnish was given equal status in the late 19th century. The position of Swedish gradually eroded in the 20th century, as population shifts from industrialisation and war increasingly caused many ethnic Finns to move to the traditional coastal and urban Swedish enclaves. In reaction, Swedish-speaking Finns renewed their cultural and linguistic connections with Sweden and a Högsvenska, based on the current variety spoken by educated mainland Swedes, emerged. However, alienation between the two countries by the lack of tangible support from Sweden during both world wars, the Finnish Civil War, and the Åland crisis gradually led to Högsvenska being seen as the prestige dialect of Finland Swedish.

In the second half of the 20th century, tensions between the centre and the periphery in Finland made the concept of a spoken standard variety less popular, and the spoken Swedish in Ostrobothnia again oriented towards Sweden, particularly when switching to more elevated registers. That resulted in a relation between Standard Swedish as spoken in Western Finland as opposed to Southern Finland, which mainly echoed the relation between Standard Swedish as spoken in Central Sweden, as opposed to Southern Sweden.

== See also ==
- Swedish phonology
- Swedish Language Council
