= Kiruna dialect =

Swedish dialect

The Kiruna dialect (Swedish: kirunamål, kirunesiska) is a dialect of Swedish spoken in the northern city of Kiruna and the surrounding municipality.

The pure Kiruna dialect is strongly influenced by Finnish and Meänkieli, presumably as a result of immigration from the east. Northern Sami, the original language of the area, has left comparatively little impact on the dialect. In addition, the Kiruna dialect bears a patchwork of small influences from numerous other dialects and languages from the south, including those from Värmland, Jämtland, Scania, Denmark, Västergötland and Ångermanland. This is because Kiruna had become a prominent settler town by the end of the 19th century, with immigrants flocking to it from across the country.

A characteristic trait of the dialect is the word jo ("yes", especially after a negative question or in quick conversation), pronounced approximately as [↓ɕuː] (found in many places in northern Norrland). This is not always used, however, and is only pronounced with ingressive airflow. Another distinctive trait of the Kiruna dialect is a heavy alveolar trill.

The Kiruna dialect is fairly commonly spoken in comparison to more endangered North Swedish dialects such as the genuine dialects of Norrbotten and Västerbotten, Lower Luleå dialect and the Lower Kalix dialect. Unlike these dialects, the Kiruna dialect does not drop word endings. The Kiruna dialect is not a genuine dialect, but a variety of Standard Swedish influenced by dialects spoken natively in the region.
