= Swedish phonology =

Sounds and pronunciation of the Swedish language

Swedish has a large vowel inventory, with nine vowels distinguished in quality and to some degree in quantity, making 18 vowel phonemes in most dialects. Another notable feature is the pitch accent, a development which it shares with Norwegian. Swedish pronunciation of most consonants is similar to that of other Germanic languages.

There are 18 consonant phonemes, of which /ɧ/ and /r/ show considerable variation depending on both social and dialectal context.

Finland Swedish has a slightly different phonology.

== Vowels ==
=== Generalities ===
The vowel phonemes of Central Standard Swedish in the Stockholm area. From Engstrand (1990:42)

Swedish has nine vowels that, as in many other Germanic languages, exist in pairs of long and short versions. The length covaries with the quality of the vowels, as shown in the table below (long vowels in the first column, short in the second), with short variants being more centered and lax. The length is generally viewed as the primary distinction, with quality being secondary. No short vowels appear in open stressed syllables. The front vowels appear in rounded-unrounded pairs: /ʏ/–/ɪ/, /yː/–/iː/, /œ/–/ɛ/ and /øː/–/eː/.

There is some variation in the interpretations of vowel length's phonemicity. Elert (1964), for example, treats vowel quantity as its own separate phoneme (a "prosodeme") so that long and short vowels are allophones of a single vowel phoneme. /iː, yː, ɑː/ have been suggested to be underspecified for backness to explain the difference with their short counterparts.

| | Front | | | | Central | | Back | |
| | unrounded | | rounded | | Central | | Back | |
| | short | long | short | long | short | long | short | long |
|---|---|---|---|---|---|---|---|---|
| Close | ɪ | iː | ʏ | yː | | ʉː | ʊ | uː |
| Close-mid | e | eː | | øː | ɵ | | | oː |
| Open-mid | ɛ | ɛː | œ | | | | ɔ | |
| Open | | | | | a | | | ɑː |

- Rounded vowels have two types of rounding:
  - /ɵ/, /ʉː/, /ʊ/ and /uː/ are compressed: [ɵᵝ], [ʉᵝː], [ʊᵝ] and [uᵝː]
  - /ʏ/, /yː/, /œ/ and its pre-/r/ allophone [œ̞], /øː/ and its pre-/r/ allophone [œ̞ː], /ɔ/ and /oː/ are protruded: [ʏ̫], [y᫇ː], [œ̫], [œ̞᫇], [ø̫ː], [œ̞᫇ː], [ɔ̫] and [o̫ː].

Speaker producing heavily centralised i-sounds, "regular" then Viby-i in isolation and in the carrier word liten 'small'. (Note: The hissing sound is due to pre-aspiration, and is not a proprety of the /iː/ itself.)

- Close vowels:
  - In Central Standard Swedish, /ɪ, ʏ/ are very peripheral and have been reported to be fully close in contemporaneous Stockholm speech, i.e. cardinal [i], [y].
  - In Central Standard Swedish, /iː, yː/ are centralised to various degree and may be accompanied by simultaneous friction (referred to as Lidingö- or Viby-i), this buzzing effect may be becoming an important auditory clue. In fact they are so centralised in Stockholm that Persson (2024) considers none of both front in the variety.
  - Persson (2024) found the roundedness of /yː/ an appropriate question for further research, from her data on Stockholm speakers of Swedish. In Göteborg a merger of /iː/ and /yː/ has been reported for younger speakers.
  - Central Standard Swedish /ʉː/ is a near-close near-front compressed vowel [ʏː]. In other dialects, /ʉː/ may be central.
- Mid vowels:
  - /ɛ, œ, ɵ/ are mid [ɛ̝, œ̝, ɵ̞]. In contemporary Stockholm speech, this is different, the main allophone of: /ɛ, œ/ is open-mid and /ɵ/ near close.
  - /ɔ/ is open-mid [ɔ]. In contemporary Stockholm speech, the main allophone is close-mid: [o].
- Open vowels:
  - /a/ has been variously described as central [ä] and front [a].
  - In Central Standard Swedish, long /ɑː/ is weakly rounded [ɒ̜ː], on par in openness with lowered /øː/ or even closer. This also occurs in Lund. The rounding is stronger in Gothenburg and weaker in most North Swedish dialects.

One of the varieties of /iː/ is made with a constriction that is more forward than is usual. (Note: As in Mira ⟦ˈmɨ̟ᶻ˦˥˨ɘɾ̞ä˦˥˩⟧ ('Given name'). The same is also true for /yː/; Thyra ⟦ˈtʰʉ̟ᶻ˦˥˨ɘɾ̞ä˦˥˩⟧ ('Given name').) Peter Ladefoged and Ian Maddieson describe this vowel as being pronounced "by slightly lowering the body of the tongue while simultaneously raising the blade of the tongue (...) Acoustically this pronunciation is characterized by having a very high F3, and an F2 which is lower than that in /eː/." They suggest that this may be the usual Stockholm pronunciation of /iː/.

In many central and eastern areas (including Stockholm), the contrast between short /ɛ/ and /e/ is lost. The loss of this contrast has the effect that hetta ('heat') and hätta ('cap') are pronounced the same. Around the 1700s, Stockholm accents began undergoing the same merger in the long system; with pairs such as tre ('three') and trä ('wood'), although it started to be seen as a class marker in the 20th century and gradually vanished.

In Central Standard Swedish, unstressed /ɛ/ is slightly retracted [ɛ̠], but is still a front vowel rather than central [ə]. However, the latter pronunciation is commonly found in Southern Swedish. Therefore, begå 'to commit' is pronounced [bɛ̠ˈɡoː] in Central Standard Swedish and [bəˈɡoː] in Southern Swedish. Before /r/, southerners may use a back vowel [ɔ]. In Central Standard Swedish, a true acoustic schwa can be heard in the voiced release of voiced consonant, as in e.g. bädd [ˈbɛdːə] 'bed'.

In some pronunciations, traditionally characteristic of the varieties spoken around Gothenburg and in Östergötland, but today more common e.g. in Stockholm and especially in younger speakers, /œ/ and /ɵ/ merge, most commonly into [ɵ̞] (especially before [r] and the retroflex consonants). Words like fördömande ('judging', pronounced /fœrˈdœ̌mandɛ/ in Standard Swedish) and fördummande ('dumbing', pronounced /fœrˈdɵmandɛ/ in Standard Swedish) are then often pronounced similarly or identically, as [fɵˈɖɵ̞mːandɛ].

In final positions, vowels are progressively devoiced. This is illustrated by research done in the 1980s focusing on the so called nolla-hallon effect; the word nolla ('(to/a) zero') played backward is unmistakably perceived as hallon ('raspberry').

=== Pre-/r/ allophones ===
/ɛ/, /ɛː/ (in stressed syllables), /œ/ and /øː/ (with a few exceptions) are lowered to [æː], [æ], [œ̞ː] and [œ̞], respectively, when preceding /r/.

Pre-/r/ open allophony
| | | input | output | | gloss |
|---|---|---|---|---|---|
| /ɛːr/ | | /ˈɛ̂ːra/ | [ˈæ̂ːrä] | ära | 'honor' |
| /ɛr/ | | /ˈɛrt/ | [ˈæʈː] | ärt | 'pea' |
| /øːr/ | | /ˈhø̂ːra/ | [ˈhœ̞̂ːrä] | höra | 'to hear' |
| /øːr/ | Lowered | /ˈø̂ːra/ | [ˈɶ̂ːrä] | öra | 'ear' |
| /œr/ | | /mœrk/ | [mœ̞rk] | mörk | 'dark' |
| /œr/ | Lowered | /dœrː/ | [ˈdɶ̝rː] | dörr | 'door' |

Older accounts extend the context to pre-/m, n/ and less often post-/r/.

Another account of varieties lowering /ɛː, øː/ shows /œr, øːr/ to be centralised i.e. [ɵ̞], [ɞː]; and /ɛ(ː)r/ to as open as /a/ i.e. [æ̞(ː)].

=== Lowering of /ɛː, øː/ ===
Younger speakers (b. c. 1980 in Stockholm) have lower realisations of /ɛː, øː/, so that läsa ('to read') and köpa ('to buy') are pronounced [ˈlæ̂ːsa] and [ˈɕœ̂ːpa] instead of older standard [ˈlɛ̂ːsa] and [ˈɕø̂ːpa]. These speakers often also pronounce pre-rhotic /øː/ and /œ/ even lower, i.e. [ɶː] and [ɶ]. This is especially true for the long allophone. (Note: Compare lowered vinäger [viˈnæːgær] ('vinegar'), mysteriös [mystəriˈjœːs] ('mysterious') with raised and clearly diphthongised läger [ˈleɛgær] ('camp'), föda [ˈfʏ̂œ̝da] ('to feed').)

This lowered pronunciation has spread to an unknown extent onto the country and has been reported from Lund to Stockholm.

Persson (2024) suggests the contrast between /ɛː, øː/ and their pre-/r/ allophone to be mainly carried by formant dynamic and onsets, the qualities gliding more towards the main allophone for pre-/r/s. She also considers reasonable to assume one single /ɛː/ allophone due to their significant overlap. Also, [ɶː] is sometimes difficult to distinguish from the long /ɑː/.

This lowering phenomenon probably has phonemic motivations, as, combined with other minor shifts, it makes Swedish go from a language with 4 different height distinction to 3. Here is a synthesis of some provisory anaylses.

Contemporary Stockholm Swedish main phones
| | Front | | | | Central | | Back | |
| | unrounded | | rounded | | Central | | Back | |
| | short | long | short | long | short | long | short | long |
|---|---|---|---|---|---|---|---|---|
| Close | ɪ | iː | ʏ | yː | ɵ | ʉː | ʊ | uː |
| Mid | ɛ | eː | œ | | (œr) | | ɔ | oː |
| Open | (ɛr) | æː | | øː | a | (øːr) | | ɑː |

- Persson (2024) groups /iː, yː, ʉː/ in one central category, according to their realisation.

=== Diphthongisation ===
Patterns of diphthongs of long vowels occur in three major dialect groups.

Mean formant values of Stockholm speech's long vowels in sentence final context. From Pelzer & Boersma (2017, Fig. 8.3)

In Central Standard Swedish:

- the high vowels /iː/, /yː/, /ʉː/ and /uː/ are realized as narrow closing diphthongs with fully close ending points: [ɪ̝i ʏ̝y ʏʉ̟ ʊü]. Engstrand transcribes these diphthongs with semivowels (or in the case of /ʉː/, a fricative): [ij yɥ ʉ̟β uw]. Elsewhere in the article, the broad transcription ⟨iː yː ʉː uː⟩ is used.
  - /ʉː/ and /uː/ in particular, have a centralising tendency. Also /ʉː/ is more strongly closing, greatly contributing to its diphthongal character.
  - Diphthongisation of /ʉː, uː/ is reported in Stockholm vernacular at the beginning of the 20th century.
  - In younger speakers, the long vowels /iː, yː/ may be fricated as [iːᶻ, yːᶻ]; this pronunciation is known as "Lidingö-i".
- the mid vowels /eː/ and /oː/ are often realized as diphthongs, alternatively described as centering or opening. They could be transcribed [iɛ̠], [ʊɔ̈]. (Note: As in hel [hiɛ̞l] ('whole'), hål [hʊɔ̈l] ('hole').) Elsewhere in the article, the broad transcription ⟨eː oː⟩ is used.
  - /ɛː/ and /øː/ have also been reported to diphthongise, but recent accounts failed to certify this for contemporary accents, making them pattern, for the most part, with /ɑː/. Narrowly [eɛ̯̈], [øœ̯] or lowered [ø̞œ̞]. (Note: As in väg [veɛg] ('way')väg [veɛg] ('way'), död [dʏød] ('dead') / bröd [brøœd] ('bread').)
  - Diphthongisation in a variety close to what would become the standard is first reported in Södertörn for all long vowels in the 17th century (Note: Described as an efterslag 'after-blow'.) and in the Central Standard for mid vowels (so including /ɛː, øː/) at the beginning of the 20th century.

Tendencies of the Diphthongisation found in South and Western Scanian varieties. From Bruce (2010:122), reproduced in Pelzer & Boersma (2017:11)

Mean formant values of Lund speech's long vowels in sentence final context. From Pelzer & Boersma (2017, Fig. 8.1)

In Southern Swedish dialects, particularly in Scania and Blekinge, the diphthongs are preceded by a rising of the tongue from a central position so that /ʉː/ and /ɑː/ are realized as [eʉ] and [aɑ] respectively.

The third type of distinctive diphthongs occur in the dialects of Gotland. The pattern of diphthongs is more complex than those of southern and eastern Sweden; /eː/, /øː/ and /ʉː/ tend to rise while /ɛː/ and /oː/ fall; /uː/, /iː/, /yː/ and /ɑː/ are not diphthongized at all.

=== Example table ===
| Vowel | Example | Vowel | Example | Vowel | Example | Vowel | Example |
|---|---|---|---|---|---|---|---|
| iː | /siːl/ sil ('sieve') | ɪ | /sɪl/ sill ('herring') | yː | /syːl/ syl ('awl') | ʏ | /sʏl/ syll ('sleeper (railroad tie)') |
| uː | /luː/ lo ('lynx') | ʊ | /lʊma/ lomma ('to lumber') | ʉː | /fʉːl/ ful ('ugly') | ɵ | /fɵl/ full ('full') |
| eː | /heːl/ hel ('whole') | ɛ | /hɛl/ häll ('stone slab') | oː | /hoːl/ hål ('hole') | ɔ | /hɔl/ håll ('direction') |
| ɛː | /hɛːl/ häl ('heel') | ɛ | /hɛl/ häll ('stone slab') | øː | /høːg/ hög ('high') | œ | /hœkt/ högt ('highly') |
| | | | | ɑː | /hɑːl/ hal ('slippery') | a | /hal/ hall ('hallway') |

== Consonants ==
The table below shows the Swedish consonant phonemes in spoken Standard Swedish.

| Place Manner | | Labial | Dental/ Alveolar | Palatal | Velar | Glottal |
|---|---|---|---|---|---|---|
| Nasal | | m | n | | ŋ | |
| Plosive | voiceless | p | t | | k | |
| Plosive | voiced | b | d | | ɡ | |
| Fricative | | f | s | ɕ | ɧ | h |
| Approximant | | v | l | j | | |
| Rhotic | | | r | | | |

/t, l/ are dental [t̪, l̪], but /n, d, s/ can be either dental [n̪, d̪, s̪] or alveolar [n, d, s]. If /d/ is alveolar, then /n/ is also alveolar. Dental realization of /n, d/ is the predominant one in Central Standard Swedish.

Utterance finally, voiced obstruents are followed by vocalic release itself smoothing out into a voiceless period. This is illustrated by another backward speech example where the word viv /viːv/ ('wife' (poetic)) and its definite form vivet /viːvɛ(t)/ are both heard as the nonce word heviv. (Note: Sometimes the H-like sound is clearly audible, bräda [ˈbrɛ̂ːdaɦ̥] ('board').)

=== Stops ===
| Phoneme | Example |
|---|---|
| p | /puːl/ pol ('pole') (of axis) |
| b | /buːk/ bok ('book') |
| t | /tuːk/ tok ('fool') |
| d | /duːp/ dop ('christening') |
| k | /kuːn/ kon ('cone') |
| ɡ | /ɡuːd/ god ('good') |

Medial lenis stops (/b, d, g/) can turn into fricatives or approximants in casual speech. (Note: As in Saudiarabien [ˈsâɵ̯diˑaˌrɑːβjɛn] ('Saudi Arabia'), bräda [ˈbrɛ̂ːða] ('board'), temadagarna [ˈtʰîɛmaˌdɑːɣæɳa] ("themed day" (awareness days, national holidays, school events...)).)

Initial fortis stops (/p, t, k/) are aspirated in stressed position, but unaspirated when preceded by /s/ within the same morpheme. (Note: Hence ko ('cow') is [kʰuː], but sko ('shoe') becomes [skuː]. Compare English [kʰuːɫ] ('cool') vs [skuːɫ] ('school').) In Finland Swedish, aspiration does not occur and initial lenis stops /b, d, ɡ/ are usually voiced throughout. Word-medial lenis stops are sometimes voiceless in Finland, a likely influence from Finnish.

Plosives are often fricated near fricatives. (Note: As in Lisbet [ˈliːsɸɛt] (phonetically /ˈliːspɛt/), Rådström [ˈrʊ̂ɔðˌsθrœm] ('Surname'), exkluderade [ɛxslɵˈðîɛradɛ] ('excluded' pst or adj.def/pl), lakritsbåts [ˈlɑ̂ːcrɪsˌβʊɔts] ('licorice boat' gen).)

Preaspiration of medial and final fortis stops, including the devoicing of preceding sonorants, is common, though its length and normativity varies from dialect to dialect, being optional (and idiolectal) in Central Standard Swedish but obligatory in, for example, the Swedish dialects of Gräsö, Vemdalen and Arjeplog. In Gräsö, preaspiration is blocked in certain environments (such as an /s/ following the fortis consonant or a morpheme boundary between the vowel and the consonant), while it is a general feature of fortis medial consonants in Central Standard Swedish. When not preaspirated, medial and final fortis stops are simply unaspirated. In clusters of fortis stops, the second "presonorant" stop is unaspirated and the former patterns with other medial final stops (that is, it is either unaspirated or is preaspirated). (Note: Example of pre-aspiration in Standard central Swedish: / /p/ / /t/ / [ʈ] / /k/; Word final / princip [pʰrɪnˈsiːʰp] ('principle') / expedit [ɛʰkspeˈdiːʰt] ('shopkeeper') / art [ɑːʰʈ] ('species') / Rättvik [ˈrɛ̂ʰtːˌviːʰc] ('Surname'); Intervocallic / / Anita [aˈnîːʰta] / arters [ˈɑ̂ːʰʈɛʂː] ('species' gen.pl) / Erika [eˈɹiːʰca]; Post-sonorant / / Walter [ˈvalʰtɛr] / / / Alkemark [ˈâlʰcɛˌmærʰc] ('Surname'); Pre-fricative / / Mats [maʰts] ('Mathias') / arts [ɑːʰʈʂ] ('species' gen) / texterna [ˈtʰɛ̂ʰkstæɳa] ('the texts'); Pre-plosive / recept [reˈsɛʰpt] ('recipe') / / / / / akt [aʰkt] ('act'))

The phonetic attributes of preaspiration also vary. In the Swedish of Stockholm, preaspiration is often realized as a fricative subject to the character of surrounding vowels or consonants so that it may be labial, velar, or dental; it may also surface as extra length of the preceding vowel. In the province of Härjedalen, though, it resembles [h] or [x]. The duration of preaspiration is highest in the dialects of Vemdalen and Arjeplog. Helgason notes that preaspiration is longer after short vowels, in lexically stressed syllables, as well as in pre-pausal position.

=== Fricatives ===
| Phoneme | Example |
|---|---|
| f | /fuːt/ fot ('foot') |
| s | /suːt/ sot ('soot') |
| ɕ | /ɕuːl/ kjol ('skirt') |
| ɧ | /ɧuːk/ sjok ('chunk') |
| h | /huːt/ hot ('threat') |

/s/ is dental [s̪] in Central Standard Swedish, but retracted alveolar [s̠] in Blekinge, Bohuslän, Halland and Scania.

The Swedish fricatives /ɕ/ and /ɧ/ are often considered to be the most difficult aspects of Swedish pronunciation for foreign students. The combination of occasionally similar and rather unusual sounds as well as the large variety of partly overlapping allophones of /ɧ/ often presents difficulties for non-natives in telling the two apart. The existence of a third sibilant in the form of /s/ tends to confuse matters even more, and in some cases realizations that are labiodental can also be confused with /f/. The historic palatized kj and tj sound /ɕ/, is an affricate [t͡ɕ] or [t͡ʃ] in Finland Swedish.

The Swedish phoneme /ɧ/ (the "sj-sound" or voiceless postalveolar-velar fricative) and its alleged coarticulation is a difficult and complex issue debated amongst phoneticians. Though the acoustic properties of its [ɧ] allophones are fairly similar, the realizations can vary considerably according to geography, age, gender as well as social context and are notoriously difficult to describe and transcribe accurately. Most common are various sh-like sounds, with [ʂ] occurring mainly in northern Sweden and [ɕ] in Finland. A voiceless uvular fricative, [χ], can sometimes be used in the varieties influenced by major immigrant languages like Arabic and Kurdish. The different realizations can be divided roughly into the following categories:

Different variants of the sj-sound. (Note: Described by the uploader as typical of Central Standard Swedish, Småland Swedish, Norrland Swedish, Finland Swedish and Rinkeby Swedish, respectively.)

- "Dark sounds" – [x], commonly used in the Southern Standard Swedish. Some of the varieties specific, but not exclusive, to areas with a larger immigrant population that commonly realizes the phoneme as a voiceless uvular fricative [χ].
- "Light sounds" – [ʂ], used in the northern varieties and [ʃ], and [ɕ] (or something in between) in Finland Swedish.
- Combination of "light" and "dark" – darker sounds are used as morpheme initials preceding stressed vowels (sjuk 'sick', station 'station'), while the lighter sounds are used before unstressed vowels and at the end of morphemes (bagage 'baggage', dusch 'shower').

See main article for more detail.

Utterance initially, /h/ is voiced and gets so progressively, as opposed to vowel onsets which aprubtly start the buzzing. Also the aspiration noise is not an important auditory cue to its presence. (Note: Examples of (partially)voiced /h/: Helmer ⟦ˈɦ̥ɛlːə̆˦˥˨mæɹ̥˦˥˨⟧, Johannes ⟦j̊oˈɦänːɛ̠s⟧ ('Given name').)

=== Sonorants ===
| Phoneme | Example |
|---|---|
| m | /muːd/ mod ('courage') |
| n | /nuːd/ nod ('node') |
| ŋ | /lɔŋ/ lång ('long') |
| r | /ruːv/ rov ('prey') |
| l | /luːv/ lov ('tack') |
| v | /voːt/ våt ('wet') |
| j | /juːrd/ jord ('earth') |

/r/ has distinct variations in Standard Swedish. For most speakers, the realization as an alveolar trill occurs only in contexts where emphatic stress is used. In Central Swedish, it is often pronounced as a fricative (transcribed as [ʐ]) or approximant (transcribed as [ɹ]), which is especially frequent in weakly articulated positions such as word-finally and somewhat less frequent in stressed syllable onsets, in particular after other consonants. It may also be an apico-alveolar tap. One of the most distinct features of the southern varieties is the uvular realization of /r/, which may be a trill [ʀ], a fricative [ʁ] or an approximant [ʁ̞]. In Finland, /r/ is usually an apical trill [r], and may be an approximant [ɹ] postvocalically.

Variations of /l/ are not as common, though some phonetic variation exists, such as a retroflex flap [ɽ] that exists as an allophone in proximity to a labial or velar consonant or after most long vowels, the same thing happens for /rd/. (Note: As in flagga [ˈfɽâgːa] ('flag'), mördare [mɶ̂ːɹɽaɾɛ] ('murderer').)

In casual speech, the nasals tend to assimilate to the place of articulation of a following obstruent. (Note: For example, han kom ('he came') is pronounced [haŋ ˈkʰɔmː])

/v/ and /j/ are pronounced with weak friction and function phonotactically with the sonorants.

=== Retroflexion ===
Examples of retroflexion
| | input | output | | gloss |
|---|---|---|---|---|
| Inflection | /fœrt/ | [fœ̞ːʈ] | fört | 'brought' sup |
| Inflection | /fœrs/ | [fœ̞ːʂ] | förs | 'is brought' pass |
| Derivation | /fœrˈtɑːl/ | [fœ̞ˈʈʰɑːl] | förtal | 'slander' |
| Derivation | /fœrˈsɔrj/ | [fœ̞ˈʂɔrj] | försorg | 'taking care' |
| Compounds | /ˈfœ̂rˌtʉːr/ | [ˈfœ̞̂ːˌʈʰʉːr] | förtur | 'priority' |
| Compounds | /ˈfœ̂rˌsɑːl/ | [ˈfœ̞̂ːˌʂɑːl] | försal | 'antechamber' |
| Across words | /fœr ˈtɵn/ | [fœ̞ˈʈʰɵnː] | för tunn | 'too thin' |
| Across words | /fœr ˈseːn/ | [fœ̞ˈʂeːn] | för sen | 'too late' |

In most varieties of Swedish that use an alveolar /r/ (in particular, the central and northern forms), the combination of /r/ with coronal consonants (/t, d, n, l, s/) produces retroflex consonant realizations ([ʈ, ɖ, ɳ, ɭ, ʂ]), a recursive sandhi process called "retroflexion". (Note: "Postalveolarization" and "supradentalization" are also common terms.) (Note: Thus, /ʊrt/ ('place') is realized as [ʊʈ], /nuːrd/ ('north') as [nuːɖ], /kuːrn/ ('grain') as [kuːɳ], and /ˈtuːrsˌoːs/ ('Torsås') as [ˈtûːʂˌoːs].) The process of retroflexion is not limited to just one coronal and applies to the whole cluster. (Note: E.g. första ('first') is pronounced [fœ̞ʂʈa].) The combination of /r/ and /l/ does not uniformly cause retroflexion, so that it may also be pronounced with two separate consonants [rl], and even, occasionally in a few words and expressions, as a mere [l]. (Note: Or in a single instance simplifying to, /r/, karl /kɑːr/.) (Note: Thus sorl ('murmur') may be pronounced [soːɭ], but also [soːrl]. /ˈpɛ̂ːrla/ ('pearl') [ˈpæ̂ːrla].)

In Gothenburg and neighbouring areas (such as Mölndal and Kungälv) the retroflex consonants are substituted by alveolar ones, with their effects still remaining. (Note: For example: /kvɑːrn/ is [kvɒːn] not [kvɒːɳ], /hoːrd/ is [hoːd], not [hoːɖ].) However, /rs/ does not become [s] but instead [ʃ]. (Note: I.e. /fɛrs/ ('mince') is [fæʃː] and not [fæsː].)

As the adjacent table shows, this process is not limited by word boundaries, though there is still some sensitivity to the type of boundary between the /r/ and the dental in that retroflexion is less likely with boundaries higher up in the prosodic hierarchy. In the southern varieties, which use a uvular /r/, (Note: Those south of Kalmar, Jönköping and Falkenberg; a little north of these cities, a uvular rhotic appears in initial position and as a long consonant (Andersson 2002, p. 273).) retroflex realizations do not occur. (Note: For example, /ˈʏtːɛʁˌdœʁː/ ('outerdoor') is realized as [ˈʏtːəʁə̆ˌdɶʁː].) An /r/ spelled ⟨rr⟩ usually will not trigger retroflexion. (Note: Such that spärrnät /ˈspæ̂rˌnɛːt/ ('anti-sub net') is pronounced [ˈspæ̂rːˌnɛːt]) Retroflexion also does not usually occur in Finland.

== Prosody ==
Map of the major tonal dialects of Norwegian and Swedish, from Riad (2014). • Dark areas have a low tone in accent 2, whereas the light areas have a high tone in accent 2. • The isogloss marks the boundary between connective and non-connective dialects. East and north of it, all of the compounds get accent 2, whereas west and south of the isogloss, compounds vary in accent.

=== Stress ===
In Swedish, stress is not fixed. Primary stress can fall on one of the last three syllables in a word’s stem. This can lead to surface contrasts based solely on difference in position of stress:

- formel /ˈfɔrmɛl/ 'formula'
- formell /fɔrˈmɛl/ 'formal'

Primary stressed syllables are always metrically heavy, i.e. contain either a long vowel or a short vowel followed by a consonant. In phonological analyses of Swedish, stressed syllables in underived forms are assumed to be associated with a basic moraic trochaic foot [μ μ]_{σ}, e.g. bˈil 'car' (stress marked as (ˈ)). More whole-word based analyses of metrical structure where affixes are included also assume other foot types, in particular, syllabic trochaic feet [σ σ]_{Ft}, bˈil-ar 'cars'. Affixes affect stress to a considerable degree in the sense that inflectional suffixes can never receive primary stress (bˈil-ar-na 'the cars'), whereas many derivational suffixes can tent-ˈabel 'examinable'. Words with accent 2 like ˈandˌe 'spirit', kvˈinnˌa 'woman', bˈilˌar 'cars' have secondary stress on the second/final syllable. See Björkhagen (1923) and Swedish Academy (1893–2023) where these words are transcribed with the stress pattern 3 2, e.g. kvin^{3}a^{2} where (^{3}) stands for primary stressed syllable with accent 2 and (^{2}) represents a ‘secondary stressed’ syllable in words with accent 2). This secondary stress is assumed to have existed in Old Norse (see Gårding (1973) and references therein). Compound words have primary stress on the first element and secondary stress on the last element bˈil-dels-butˌiken 'car-part shop' (secondary stress marked as (ˌ)).

=== Pitch accents ===
Stressed syllables carry one of two different tones, often described as pitch accents, or tonal word accents. They are called acute and grave accent, accent 1 and accent 2. The actual realization of these two tones varies from dialect to dialect. In the central Swedish dialect of Stockholm, accent 1 is characterized by a low tone at the beginning of the stressed syllable (fìsken 'the fish') and accent 2 by a high tone at the beginning of the stressed syllable (mátta 'mat'). When the word is in a prominent/focused position, a high tone often occurs following the word accent (fìskén). In accent 2 words, this results in two high tones within the word (e.g. máttá), hence the term "two-peaked" for this dialect. In southern Swedish, a "one-peaked" dialect, accent 1 is realized as a high tone at the beginning of the stressed syllable (físken) and accent 2, by a low tone (màtta). Generally, the grave accent is characterized by a later timing of the word accent pattern as compared with the acute accent.

The phonemicity of this tonal system is demonstrated in the nearly 300 pairs of two-syllable words differentiated only by their use of either grave or acute accent. Outside of these pairs, the main tendency for tone is that the acute accent appears in monosyllables (since the grave accent cannot appear in monosyllabic words) while the grave accent appears in polysyllabic words. Polysyllabic forms resulting from declension or derivation also tend to have a grave accent except when it is the definite article that is added. This tonal distinction has been present in Scandinavian dialects at least since Old Norse though a greater number of polysyllables now have an acute accent. These are mostly words that were monosyllabic in Old Norse, but have subsequently become disyllabic, as have many loanwords. For example, Old Norse kømr ('comes') has become kommer in Swedish (with an acute accent).

The distinction can be shown with the minimal pair anden 'the mallard' (tone 1) and anden 'the spirit' (tone 2).

˴anden, ˵anden
A Central Swedish realization of the difference between acute (single) and grave (double) accents

- "Acute" accent (tone 1): /˴anden/ (realized [ˈa᷇ndɛ̀n] = [ˈan˥˧dɛn˩]) 'the mallard' (from and 'mallard')

In Central Swedish, this is a high, slightly falling tone followed by a low tone; that is, a single drop from high to low pitch spread over two syllables.

- "Grave" accent (tone 2): /˵anden/ (realized [ˈa᷆ndɛ̂n] = [ˈan˧˩dɛn˥˩]) 'the spirit' (from ande 'spirit')

In Central Swedish, this is a mid falling tone followed by a high falling tone; that is, a double falling tone over two syllables.

The exact realization of the tones also depends on the syllable's position in an utterance. For instance, at the beginning of an utterance, the acute accent may have a rising rather than slightly falling pitch on the first syllable. Also, these are word tones that are spread across the syllables of the word. In trisyllabic words with the grave accent, the second fall in pitch is distributed across the second and third syllables:

- Grave-accent trisyllable: flickorna /ˈflɪ̂kʊɳa/ (realized [ˈflɪ᷆kːʊ᷇ɳà] = [ˈflɪ˧˩kːʊ˥˧ɳa˩]) 'the girls'

The position of the tone is dependent upon stress: The first stressed syllable has a high or falling tone, as does the following syllable(s) in grave-accented words.

In most Finland-Swedish varieties, however, the distinction between grave and acute accent is missing.

A reasonably complete list of uncontroversial so-called minimal pairs can be seen below. The two words in each pair are distinguished solely by having different tone (acute vs. grave). In those cases where both words are nouns it would have been possible to list the genitive forms of the words as well, thereby creating another word pair, but this has been avoided. A few word pairs where one of the words is a plural form with the suffix -or have been included. This is due to the fact that many Swedish-speakers in all parts of Sweden pronounce the suffix -or the same way as -er.

Swedish accentual minimal pairs
| Translation acute | Acute accent (accent 1) | Grave accent (accent 2) | Translation grave |
|---|---|---|---|
| stern (of boat/ship) | akter | akter | acts |
| the elm | almen | allmän | public, general |
| the As | A:na | ana | suspect |
| the mallard | anden | anden | the spirit |
| the reverse gear, the crate | backen | backen | the slope |
| the ball (dance event) | balen | balen | the nest |
| the bulb (on horse) | ballen | ballen | the dick (slang for penis) |
| the Bs | B:na | bena | parting (hair) |
| binds | binder | bindor | sanitary towels |
| the piece | biten | biten | bitten |
| the book | boken | boken | overripe, spoilt (of fruit) |
| the nests | bona | bona | polish |
| the nests' (genitive of 'bona') | bonas | bonas | be polished (passive of 'bona') |
| the bristles | borsten | borsten | the brush, the broom |
| the brace (sailing) | brassen | brassen | the Brazilian |
| the letters | breven | brevvän | pen pal |
| breaks (present tense of 'brista') | brister | brister | flaws |
| the well | brunnen | brunnen | burnt (past participle of 'brinna') |
| the edges of forests | brynen | brynen | whetstones |
| the edge of a forest | brynet | brynet | the whetstone |
| the cage | buren | buren | carried (past participle of 'bära') |
| the pranks | busen | busen | the hooligan |
| the trolling spoons | dragen | dragen | drawn (past participle of 'dra'), tipsy |
| the draught, the trolling spoon | draget | draget | drawn (past participle of 'dra') |
| the speed, the energy | drivet | drivet | drifted, driven (past participle of 'driva') |
| the Es | E:na | ena | unite, unify |
| male name | Enar | enar | junipers |
| the falls | fallen | fallen | fallen (past participle of 'falla') |
| the fall | fallet | fallet | fallen (past participle of 'falla') |
| fastens | fäster | fester | parties |
| the fish | fisken | fisken | acts of fishing |
| the Fs | F:en | FN | The UN |
| the phone (in phonetics) | fonen | fånen | the idiot |
| the armfuls | fången | fången | the prisoner |
| the armful | fånget | fånget | caught (past participle of 'fånga') |
| the rug | fällen | fällen | places where trees have been felled |
| fells, cuts down | fäller | fällor | traps (plural of the noun 'fälla') |
| the party, the feast | festen | fästen | places where something has been attached |
| the bow (on ship/boat) | fören | fören | conditions of the ground for travelling (plural of 'före') |
| towards the bow (on ship/boat) | förut | förut | before, earlier |
| marries | gifter | gifter | poisons (plural of 'gift') |
| the poison | giftet | giftet | the marriage |
| the Js | J:na | gina | tackle (sailing), take a shortcut |
| the deal (in card games) | given | given | given |
| the candles | ljusen | gjusen | the osprey |
| the griffin | gripen | gripen | grabbed, gripped (past participle of 'gripa') |
| the walkway | gången | gången | gone (past participle of 'gå') |
| the heath | heden | heden | heathen (adjective) |
| has the time to do something | hinner | hinnor | coatings |
| the cuts (made with a heavy object like an axe) | huggen | huggen | chopped (past participle of 'hugga') |
| the directions | hållen | hållen | held (past participle of 'hålla') |
| the direction | hållet | hållet | held (past participle of 'hålla') |
| the Hs | H:na | håna | mock, taunt |
| higher | högre | högre | the man to the right (as in 'den högre') |
| the ide | iden | iden | bears' dens for hibernation |
| the Is | I:na | Ina | female name |
| ahead of, in front of | inför | inför | introduces, introduce (present tense or imperative of 'införa') |
| the sounds | ljuden | juden | the Jew |
| the carat | karaten | karaten | the karate |
| the cat | katten | katten | a profanity (as in for example 'Katten också!') |
| the bang | knallen | knallen | the small hill, the pedlar |
| the knot | knuten | knuten | tied (past participle of 'knyta') |
| the bowler hat | kubben | kubben | the chopping block (for wood) |
| the litter (group of newborn animals) | kullen | kullen | the hill |
| the corps | kåren | kåren | the breeze |
| the lichen | laven | laven | the headframe |
| leads (present tense of 'leda') | leder | leder | joints (anatomy) |
| the military service | lumpen | lumpen | contemptible, lousy |
| the moth | malen | malen | ground, milled (past participle of 'mala') |
| the milk | mjölken | mjölken | the fish seed |
| the courage | modet | modet | the fashion |
| the mop | moppen | moppen | the moped |
| the names | namnen | namnen | the namesake |
| the norm | normen | norrmän | Norwegians |
| the tack | nubben | nubben | the shot (alcohol) |
| pinches (present tense of 'nypa') | nyper | nypor | Grips made with the thumb against one or more of the other fingers (plural noun) |
| name of a Norse God | Oden | oden | odes |
| the mite | oret | orätt | injustice |
| the rabble (definite plural of 'pack') | packen | packen | the bale |
| clown | pajas | pajas | be destroyed (passive of 'paja') |
| panther | panter | panter | deposits |
| Persians | perser | pärser | ordeals |
| Poland | Polen | pålen | the pole (thick wooden stick) |
| pollen | pollen | pållen | the horsey |
| radar | radar | radar | present tense of 'rada', as in 'rada upp' (=list something) |
| grid | raster | raster | breaks (in school or at a workplace, i.e. for example coffee breaks) |
| rule | regel | regel | latch |
| travels (present tense of 'resa') | reser | resor | journeys, trips |
| the melee, the fighting | rivet | rivet | torn |
| cylinder that rotates and is used for painting | roller | roller | roles |
| diamonds (in card games) | ruter | rutor | squares, (window) panes |
| the route | rutten | rutten | rotten |
| the rye | rågen | rågen | the overmeasure |
| the nymphs | råna | råna | rob |
| the horizontal bars (gymnastics) | räcken | räcken | railings |
| the horizontal bar (gymnastics) | räcket | räcket | the railing |
| runs | ränner | rännor | chutes |
| sabbath | sabbat | sabbat | destroyed, sabotaged (past participle of 'sabba') |
| cedar | ceder | seder | customs (traditions) |
| the Cs | C:na | sena | late (plural of 'sen'), sinew |
| cider | cider | sidor | pages |
| the view | sikten | sikten | sights (on rifles, plural of 'sikte') |
| the barks (dog sounds) | skallen | skallen | the skull |
| the spoon | skeden | skeden | stages (of time) |
| the shift | skiftet | skiftet | the change |
| the shifts | skiften | skiften | changes |
| the ejaculations | skjuten | skjuten | shot (past participle of 'skjuta') |
| the speed, the ejaculation | skjutet | skjutet | shot (past participle of 'skjuta') |
| the shots | skotten | skotten | the Scotsman |
| the (rain) shower | skuren | skuren | cut (past participle of 'skära') |
| the gunner | skytten | skytten | acts of shooting |
| the battles, the hits | slagen | slagen | beaten |
| the battle, the hit | slaget | slaget | beaten |
| the toil | slitet | slitet | worn |
| the ends | sluten | sluten | closed (past participle of 'sluta') |
| the end | slutet | slutet | closed (past participle of 'sluta') |
| the (extended) family | släkten | släkten | genera (biology) |
| the cop | snuten | snuten | past participle of 'snyta' (=blow one's nose) |
| the zoos | zoona | sona | expiate |
| the stocks (cooking) | spaden | spaden | the spade |
| the spas | spana | spana | watch, observe, search |
| bursts, cracks (present tense of the verb 'spricka') | spricker | sprickor | cracks (plural of the noun 'spricka') |
| the steps | stegen | stegen | the ladder |
| fights (present tense of 'strida') | strider | strider | fights, battles (plural of the noun 'strid') |
| the moving patches/bands (of something) | stråken | stråken | the bow (for a violin) |
| the stubble | stubben | stubben | the tree stump |
| the racks | ställen | ställen | places (locations) |
| the rack | stället | stället | the place |
| the sucking device | sugen | sugen | sucked (past participle of 'suga'), in the mood for something |
| the urge | suget | suget | sucked (past participle of 'suga'), in the mood for something |
| the seed, the grain | säden | säden | things intended for sowing (plural of 'säde') |
| the cell | cellen | sällen | the brute |
| the grips | tagen | tagen | taken |
| the grip | taget | taget | taken |
| the tank | tanken | tanken | the thought |
| toner | toner | toner | tones |
| the trot | traven | traven | the pile, the stack |
| the plot (of land) | tomten | tomten | Santa Claus, the gnome |
| the inch | tummen | tummen | the thumb |
| sign | tecken | täcken | bed covers |
| the point, the cusp | udden | udden | the headland |
| uphill | uppför | uppför | present tense or imperative of 'uppföra' (=set up a theatre play, behave) |
| downhill | utför | utför | present tense or imperative of 'utföra' (=carry out) |
| the hole in the ice | vaken | vaken | awake |
| the whale | valen | valen | stiff, numb |
| the shrouds (sailing) | vanten | vanten | the mitten |
| the vase | vasen | vasen | the bundle of brushwood |
| the bay | viken | viken | folded (past participle of 'vika') |
| makes a whistling sound (of for example wind) | viner | viner | wines |
| the knobs | vreden | vreden | the rage, the wrath |
| the host/the world | värden/världen | värden | values |
| male name | Oskar | åskar | present tense of 'åska' (=thunder) |
| the gravel | ören | ören | pennies (plural of the monetary unit 'öre' used when no numeral immediately precedes the word) |
| the gravel | öret | öret | the penny (1/100 of a Swedish krona) |

Note that karaten/karaten is the only pair with more than two syllables (although we would get a second one if we used the definite forms of the pair perser/pärser, i.e. perserna/pärserna). The word pair länder ('countries', plural of land) and länder ('loins', plural of länd) could have been included, but this one is controversial. For those speakers who have grave accent in the plural of länd, the definite plural forms will also constitute a three-syllable minimal pair: länderna (acute accent, 'the countries') vs. länderna (grave accent, 'the loins'). Although examples with more than two syllables are very few in Standard Swedish, it is possible to find other three-syllable pairs in regional dialects, such as Värmländska: hunnera (acute, 'the Huns') vs. hunnera (grave, 'the dogs'), ändera/ännera (acute, 'the mallards') vs. ändera/ännera (grave, 'the ends'), etc.

Prosody in Swedish often varies substantially between different dialects including the spoken varieties of Standard Swedish. As in most languages, stress can be applied to emphasize certain words in a sentence. To some degree prosody may indicate questions, although less so than in English.

== Phonotactics ==
At a minimum, a stressed syllable must consist of either a long vowel or a short vowel and a long consonant. Like many other Germanic languages, Swedish has a tendency for closed syllables with a relatively large number of consonant clusters in initial as well as final position. Though not as complex as that of most Slavic languages, examples of up to 7 consecutive consonants can occur when adding Swedish inflections to some foreign loanwords or names, and especially when combined with the tendency of Swedish to make long compound nouns. The syllable structure of Swedish can therefore be described with the following formula:

(C)(C)(C)V(C)(C)(C)

This means that a Swedish one-syllable morpheme can have up to three consonants preceding the vowel that forms the nucleus of the syllable, and three consonants following it. Examples: skrämts /skrɛmts/ (verb 'scare' past participle, passive voice) or sprängts /sprɛŋts/ (verb 'explode' past participle, passive voice). All but one of the consonant phonemes, /ŋ/, can occur at the beginning of a morpheme, though there are only 6 possible three-consonant combinations, all of which begin with /s/, and a total of 31 initial two-consonant combinations. All consonants except for /h/ and /ɕ/ can occur finally, and the total number of possible final two-consonant clusters is 62.

In some cases this can result in very complex combinations, such as in västkustskt /ˈvɛ̂stˌkɵstskt/, consisting of västkust ('west coast') with the adjective suffix -sk and the neuter suffix -t.

Central Standard Swedish and most other Swedish dialects feature a rare "complementary quantity" feature wherein a phonologically short consonant follows a long vowel and a long consonant follows a short vowel; this is true only for stressed syllables and all segments are short in unstressed syllables. This arose from the historical shift away from a system with a four-way contrast (that is, VːCː, VC, VːC and VCː were all possible) inherited from Proto-Germanic to a three-way one (VC, VːC and VCː), and finally the present two-way one; certain Swedish dialects have not undergone these shifts and exhibit one of the other two phonotactic systems instead. In literature on Swedish phonology, there are a number of ways to transcribe complementary relationship, including:

- A length mark ː for either the vowel (/viːt/) or the consonant (/vitː/)
- Gemination of the consonant (/vit/ vs. /vitt/)
- Diphthongisation of the vowel (/vijt/ vs. /vit/)
- The position of the stress marker (/viˈt/ vs. /vitˈ/) - a non-IPA notation as the stress mark does not precede the stressed syllable in this case

With the conventional assumption that medial long consonants are ambisyllabic (that is, penna ('pen'), is syllabified as [ˈpɛ̂n.na]), all stressed syllables are thus "heavy". In unstressed syllables, the distinction is lost between /u/ and /o/ or between /e/ /ɛ/. With each successive post-stress syllable, the number of contrasting vowels decreases gradually with distance from the point of stress; at three syllables from stress, only [a] and [ɛ] occur.

Swedish allows a rare type of cluster combining liquids, a consonantal yod and another consonant. Finally this may be simplified by vocalisation or with a svarabhakti vowel. (Note: As in veckohelgs [ˈvɛ̂kːoˌhɛlis] ('weekend'), familj [faˈmɪlːɪ̆j] and Hedberg [ˈhîɛdə̆ˌbærjə̆] ('Surname'))
