= Nyborg (disambiguation) =

Nyborg is a city in Denmark.

Nyborg may also refer to:

- Nyborg, Sweden, a village in Sweden
- Nyborg, Norway, a village north of Flaktveit, Norway

== People with the surname ==
- Peter Nyborg (born 1969), Swedish tennis player
- Gunn Nyborg (born 1960), Norwegian football player
- Helmuth Nyborg (born 1937), Danish professor of developmental psychology at Aarhus University
- Keith Foote Nyborg, United States Ambassador to Finland
- Reidar Nyborg (1923–1990), Norwegian cross-country skier
- Torill Selsvold Nyborg (born 1952), Norwegian nurse, missionary and politician

=== Fictional ===
- Birgitte Nyborg, a character in Borgen
