= Karlsborg, Kalix Municipality =

Karlsborg
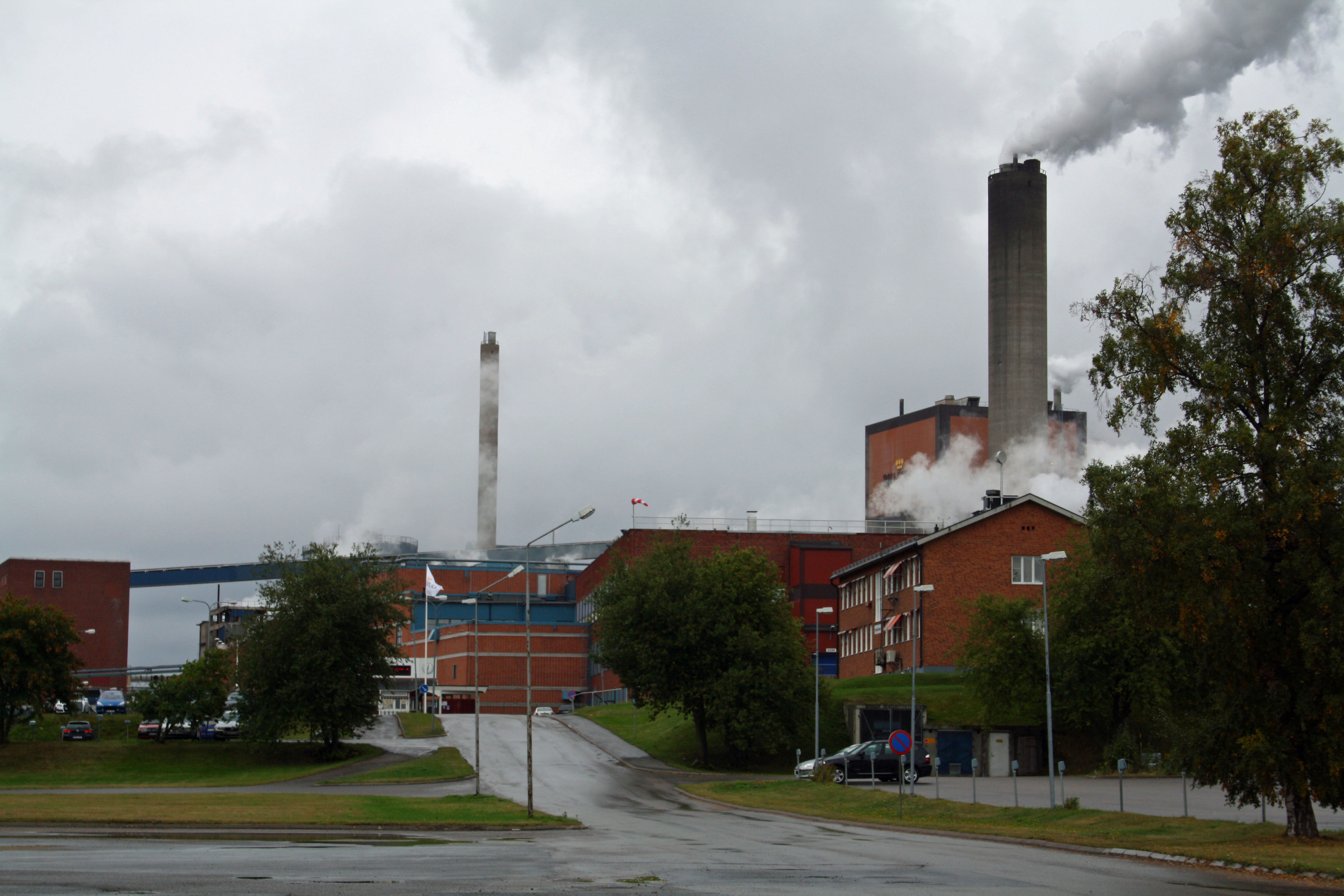

- Location within Norrbotten Location within Sweden
- Coordinates: 65°48′N 23°17′E
- Country: Sweden
- Province: Norrbotten
- County: Norrbotten County
- Municipality: Kalix Municipality

Area
  - Total: 2.04 km^{2} (0.79 sq mi)

Population (31 December 2010)
  - Total: 351
  - Density: 172/km^{2} (450/sq mi)
- Time zone: UTC+1 (CET)
  - Summer (DST): UTC+2 (CEST)

Karlsborg (Swedish pronunciation: [ˈkɑ̂ːɭsbɔrj]; Kalix Language: kjalsbåri) locality situated in Kalix Municipality, Norrbotten County, Sweden with 351 inhabitants in 2010. Their bandy club Karlsborgs BK has played in the highest division.
