= Karlsborgs BK =

Bandy club in Karlsborg, Sweden

- City: Karlsborg, Sweden
- League: Division 1
- Division: Övre Norrland
- Founded: 26 April 1976; 50 years ago
- Home arena: Bruksvallen

Karlsborgs Bandyklubb, Karlsborgs BK, is a bandy club in Karlsborg in Kalix Municipality, Sweden. The team colours are black and yellow. The club was founded on 26 April 1976, out of the bandy section of former sports club Karlsborgs IK, while the football department became Assi IF.

The club also played three seasons in the Swedish top division between 1996 and 1997, 1997-1998 and 1998–1999.

The club was playing in Allsvenskan, the second level bandy league in Sweden, until 2009 when it was relegated to Division 1.
