= Schwammel =

Schwammel may refer to:

- Ade Schwammel (1908–1979), an American football player
- schwammeL, a mild profanity in the Kalix language

== See also ==
- Schwammerl (disambiguation)
