= Doris Bloom =

South African painter (born 1954)

- Born: 1954 (age 71–72); Vereeniging, Gauteng, South Africa
- Education: Royal Danish Academy of Fine Arts
- Occupation: Painter

Doris Bloom (born 1954 in Vereeniging, South Africa) is a South African painter who also incorporates performance art into her work. She lives and works in Denmark.

== Biography ==
During 1972, Bloom attended Johannesburg College of Art and later attended Royal Danish Academy of Fine Arts in 1976. She has receive Queen Ingrid's Great Roman Grant, Villiam H. Michaelsen's Grant, and The State Art Council's Grant. Doris Bloom is Jewish.

== Career ==
Bloom has showcased exhibitions since 1977. For exhibitions she is known for doing solo acts as well as collaborations. Bloom is also known for performances during exhibitions, many of them involve her doing a performance in front of a finished work, but some also include her creating the artwork in front of viewers. Bloom uses many different mediums for her work; oil, watercolor, crayon, and mixed media.

== Works ==
- Composition, 1985
- Tyrants of tolerance 1, 1991
- Candles in the wind 1, 1995
- Oval office 2, 1991-1998
- Three Compositions, 2003

== Exhibitions ==
- Albertslund Municipality, Denmark (mural) 1977
- Franz Pedersens Kunthandel, Denmark (solo) 1985
- Studio E, Rome (solo) 1986
- Gallery 11, DR TV (performance), 1991
- 9th International Cairo Biennale, Egypt 2003
- YAM-ADAM-DAM-ADAMA, Gammelgaard, Denmark (solo) 2010
