= Ytterbyn =

Human settlement

Coordinates: 65°47′54″N 23°10′18″E

Ytterbyn is a village in Kalix Municipality, Norrbotten, Sweden. It forms part of the locality Nyborg. It has access to multiple hotels.
