= Morjärv railway station =

Railway station in Kalix, Sweden

Morjärv
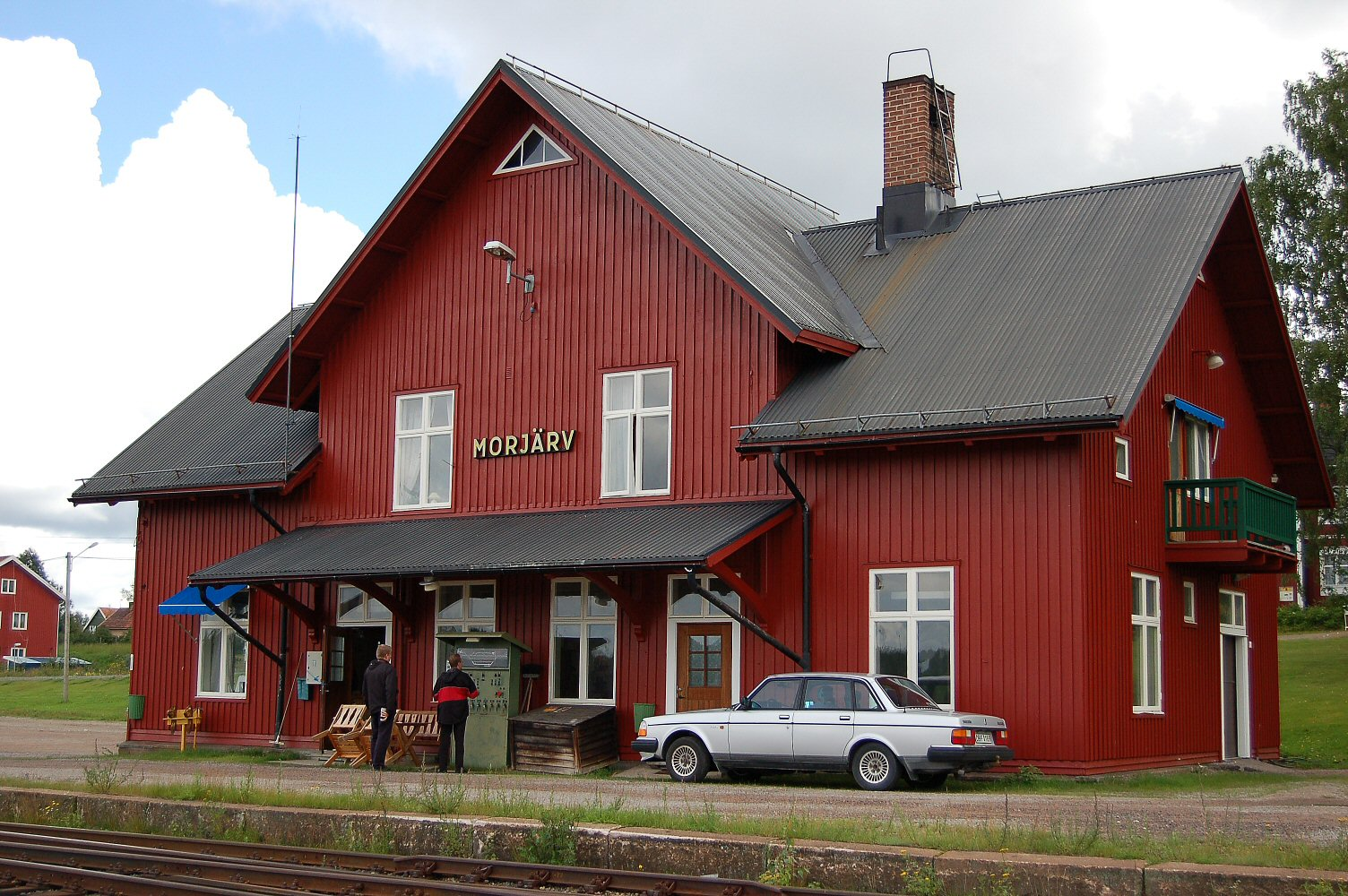

General information
- Location: Morjärv, Kalix; Sweden
- Coordinates: 66°04′10″N 22°41′55″E
- Elevation: 37 m (121 ft)
- Owner: Swedish Transport Administration
- Operator: Trafikverket
- Lines: Haparandabanan; Morjärv-Karlborgsbruk railway
- Distance: 1217 km (Stockholm C)
- Platforms: 1 (disused)

History
- Opened: 1902
Location

Morjärv Station (Swedish: Morjärv järnvägsstation; Finnish: Morajärven rautatieasema) is a railway station located on the Boden to Haparanda railway line in the village of Morjärv in northern Sweden. The railway was built in 1902, and Morjärv became a railway junction in 1961 when the Morjärv to Karlsborgsbruk secondary line was completed. The Morjärv station was the last staffed station between Boden and Haparanda until 2012 when the new signaling system was installed. There is no passenger traffic stopping at Morjärv, not since year 2000. But since 2021, there is passenger traffic again between Boden-Haparanda, but the train doesn't stop in the village. The Swedish Transport Administration that owns the building didn't see any use anymore to own the building, and it was decided that they wanted to demolish it, but a decision came from Kalix municipality in 2018 that it could not be demolished.
