= Morjärv =

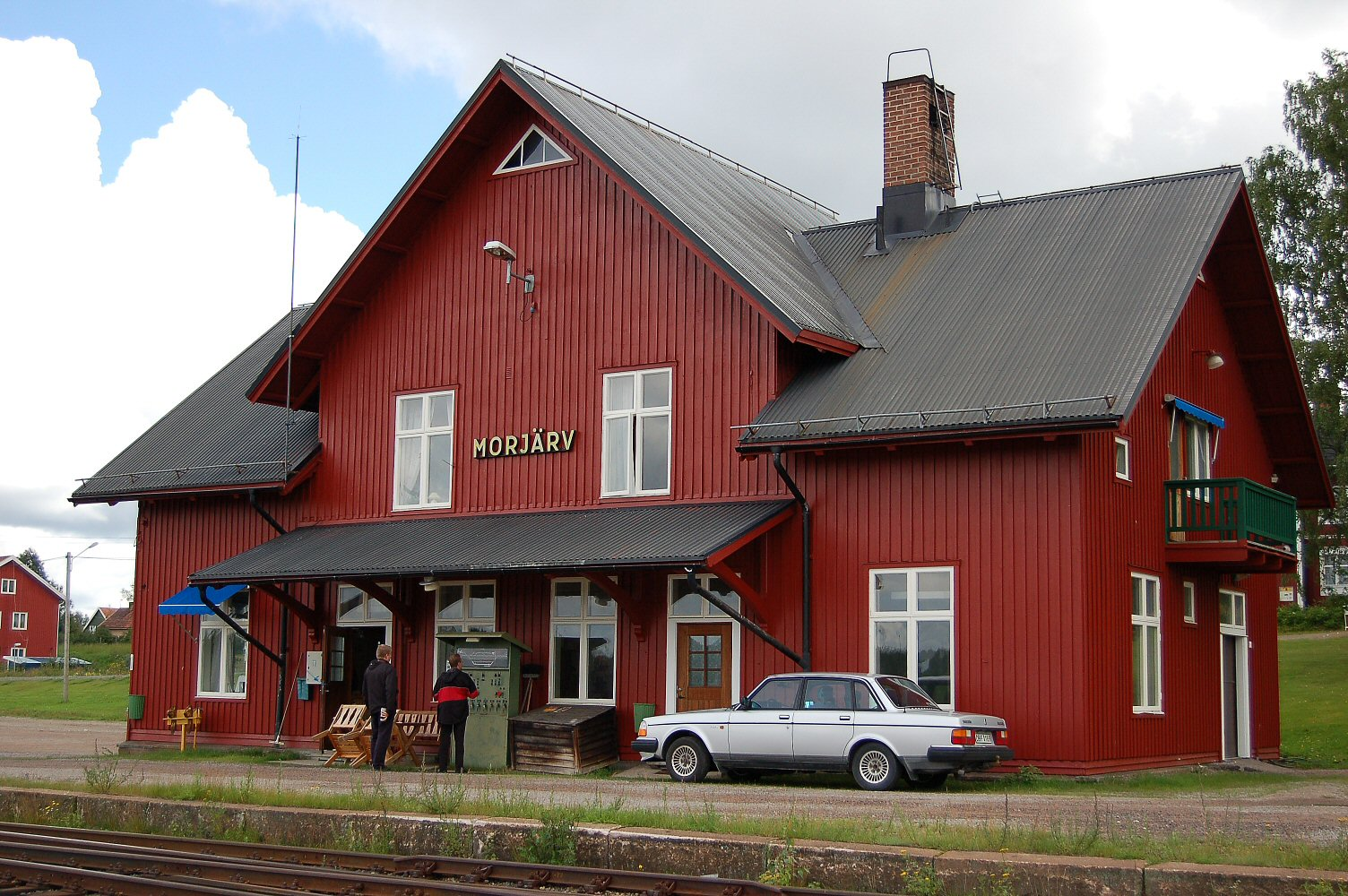
- Morjärv railway station

- Location within Norrbotten Location within Sweden
- Coordinates: 66°04′N 22°43′E
- Country: Sweden
- Province: Norrbotten
- County: Norrbotten County
- Municipality: Kalix Municipality

Area
  - Total: 0.96 km^{2} (0.37 sq mi)

Population (31 December 2010)
  - Total: 201
  - Density: 208/km^{2} (540/sq mi)
- Time zone: UTC+1 (CET)
  - Summer (DST): UTC+2 (CEST)

Morjärv (Kalix language: morajärv) is a locality situated in Kalix Municipality, Norrbotten County, Sweden with 201 inhabitants in 2010.
