= Rolfs =

- Location within Norrbotten Location within Sweden
- Coordinates: 65°51′N 23°07′E
- Country: Sweden
- Province: Norrbotten
- County: Norrbotten County
- Municipality: Kalix Municipality

Area
  - Total: 2.08 km^{2} (0.80 sq mi)

Population (31 December 2010)
  - Total: 1,061
  - Density: 511/km^{2} (1,320/sq mi)
- Time zone: UTC+1 (CET)
  - Summer (DST): UTC+2 (CEST)

Rolfs (Kalix Language: rårs) is a locality situated in Kalix Municipality, Norrbotten County, Sweden with 1,061 inhabitants in 2010.
