= Luleå dialects =

Group of North Swedish dialects

The Luleå dialects (Swedish: lulemål, natively bondska) are a group of closely related North Swedish dialects spoken in Norrbotten in the area of Luleå and along the Lule River valley. They are characterised by numerous archaic linguistic features as well as several newer borrowings, such as French loanwords likely picked up in the 18th century. Among the distinctive features of the dialects are the use of preserved archaic diphthongs and the so-called "thick L", a retroflex flap which is commonly represented as a capital "L" when writing the dialect. For example, Standard Swedish hus ("house") is heos in this dialect, bord ("table") is båoL, and is ("ice") is öys.

The more archaic forms of the dialect are no longer widely spoken today.

== See also ==
- Piteå dialects
- Kalix language
