= Schwammerl =

Schwammerl may refer to:

- Schwammerl, a nickname of Franz Schubert
- Schwammerl, a novel about Schubert by Rudolf Hans Bartsch

== See also ==
- Schwammel (disambiguation)
