= Påläng =

Pålänge
- Location within Norrbotten Location within Sweden
- Coordinates: 65°49′N 22°54′E
- Country: Sweden
- Province: Norrbotten
- County: Norrbotten County
- Municipality: Kalix Municipality

Area
  - Total: 0.89 km^{2} (0.34 sq mi)

Population (31 December 2010)
  - Total: 278
  - Density: 314/km^{2} (810/sq mi)
- Time zone: UTC+1 (CET)
  - Summer (DST): UTC+2 (CEST)

Pålänge is a locality situated in Kalix Municipality, Norrbotten County, Sweden with 278 inhabitants in 2010.

== Activities & Wildlife ==
The "Kojan på Berget" In Pålänge is a centrally located cabin on "Degerberget" mountain. Built sometime around the 1970s, it is now free for everyone to use and can be visited year round. The village is surrounded by nature and pristine countryside, making it attractive to nature photographers.

The village also offers attractions for visitors to Pålänge, who can stay at Country & Beach, which boasts a range of nature activities in the Norrlänska forest.
