= Marahamnen =

Settlement in Kalix Municipality, Sweden

Coordinates: 65°46′N 23°11′E

Marahamnen is a village in Kalix Municipality, Norrbotten County, Sweden.
