= Risögrund =

- Location within Norrbotten Location within Sweden
- Coordinates: 65°48′N 23°15′E
- Country: Sweden
- Province: Norrbotten
- County: Norrbotten County
- Municipality: Kalix Municipality

Area
  - Total: 0.91 km^{2} (0.35 sq mi)

Population (31 December 2010)
  - Total: 697
  - Density: 767/km^{2} (1,990/sq mi)
- Time zone: UTC+1 (CET)
  - Summer (DST): UTC+2 (CEST)

Risögrund is a locality situated in Kalix Municipality, Norrbotten County, Sweden with 697 inhabitants in 2010.

== Sports ==
The following sports clubs are located in Risögrund:

- Assi IF
