= Bredviken =

- Location within Norrbotten Location within Sweden
- Coordinates: 65°50′N 23°13′E
- Country: Sweden
- Province: Norrbotten
- County: Norrbotten County
- Municipality: Kalix Municipality

Area
  - Total: 0.43 km^{2} (0.17 sq mi)

Population (31 December 2010)
  - Total: 365
  - Density: 846/km^{2} (2,190/sq mi)
- Time zone: UTC+1 (CET)
  - Summer (DST): UTC+2 (CEST)

Bredviken is a locality situated in Kalix Municipality, Norrbotten County, Sweden with 365 inhabitants in 2010.
