= Assi IF =

Swedish football club

- Full name: Assi Idrottsförening
- Founded: 1968
- Ground: Billerud Arena, Risögrund, Sweden
- Chairman: Lennart Vikström
- Coach: Ingvar Gälman; Karl-Göran Lindbäck; Olov Nordgren (GK)
- League: Division 2 Norrland
- 2012: Division 2 Norrland, 8th
- Website: www.assifotboll.se
Home colours	Away colours

Assi IF is a Swedish football team, located in Risögrund, Kalix Municipality, Norrbotten County, currently playing in Division 2 Norrland.

== Background ==
Assi IF is a club that dates back to 1915. The current club was established in 1968 when Karlsborgs IK and Risöns AIS merged under the influence of the AB Statens Skogsindustrier. The men's team has played in the lower divisions of the Swedish football league system in Divisions 2, 3, 4 and 5. The club's most successful period was in the late 1990s when they spent 3 seasons in Division 2 in 1996, 1998 and 1999. The women's soccer team played in the Swedish top division in 1979.

The club has made considerable development in recent years and is now the largest in Eastern Norrbotten with 800 members of whom around 350 are active. The club run a large number of teams many of which face log trips for competitive matches.

The club won the Midnattsolscupen (Midnight Sun Cup) in 1991, 1995 and 1999.

The club is affiliated to the Norrbottens Fotbollförbund.

== Season to season ==
Season	Level	Division	Section	Position	Movements
1993	Tier 5	Division 4	Norrbotten Norra	2nd	
1994	Tier 5	Division 4	Norrbotten Norra	1st	Promoted
1995	Tier 4	Division 3	Norra Norrland	1st	Promoted
1996	Tier 3	Division 2	Norrland	10th	Relegated
1997	Tier 4	Division 3	Norra Norrland	1st	Promoted
1998	Tier 3	Division 2	Norrland	9th	
1999	Tier 3	Division 2	Norrland	10th	Relegated
2000	Tier 4	Division 3	Norra Norrland	12th	Relegated
2001	Tier 5	Division 4	Norrbotten Norra	3rd	
2002	Tier 5	Division 4	Norrbotten Norra	9th	Relegated
2003	Tier 6	Division 5	Norrbotten Mellersta	1st	Promoted
2004	Tier 5	Division 4	Norrbotten Norra	3rd	
2005	Tier 5	Division 4	Norrbotten Norra	3rd	
2006*	Tier 6	Division 4	Norrbotten Norra	2nd	
2007	Tier 6	Division 4	Norrbotten Norra	2nd	Promoted
2008	Tier 5	Division 3	Norra Norrland	8th	
2009	Tier 5	Division 3	Norra Norrland	9th	
2010	Tier 5	Division 3	Norra Norrland	4th	
2011	Tier 5	Division 3	Norra Norrland	1st	Promoted
2012	Tier 4	Division 2	Norrland	8th	
2013	Tier 4	Division 2	Norrland		

* League restructuring in 2006 resulted in a new tier being created at Tier 3 and subsequent divisions dropping a level.

== 2013 squad ==
Note: Flags indicate national team as defined under FIFA eligibility rules; some limited exceptions apply. Players may hold more than one non-FIFA nationality.

No.	Pos.	Nation	Player
1	GK	SWE	Tomas Adell
2	MF	SWE	Adam Nordgren
3	DF	SWE	Marcus Kangasma
4	MF	SWE	Robin Parviainen
5	DF	SWE	Simon Gustafsson
6	FW	SWE	Johan Nyberg
7	DF	SWE	Herman Nilsson
9	FW	SWE	Mattias Nilsson
10	DF	SWE	Jakob Josefsson
11	MF	SWE	Robin Gälman
13	DF	SWE	Lars Juntti
14	MF	FIN	Juoni Talvensaari

No.	Pos.	Nation	Player
15	DF	SWE	Glenn Edvartsen
16	DF	SWE	Johan Vikström
17	DF	SWE	Andreas Nilsson
18	DF	FIN	Janne Turpeenniemi
19	MF	SWE	Erik Juntti
20	FW	SWE	Andreas Liakka
21	DF	FIN	Jussi-Esko Berg
22	MF	SWE	Jacob Resin
24	MF	ESP	Yemel Aisa Mohand
25	FW	SWE	Samuel Wiklund
32	GK	SWE	Jens Resin
90	GK	SWE	John Johansson

== Staff and board members ==
- (Sweden) Lennart Vikström – President
- (Sweden) Ingela Resin – Secretary
- (Sweden) Soren Hahto – Treasurer
- (Sweden) Bertil Johansson – Director
