= Jämtland dialects =

Language spoken in Jämtland, Sweden

- Jamtish
- jamska, jamtska
- Region: Jämtland
- Native speakers: (30,000 cited 2000)
- Language family: Indo-European: Germanic; Northwest Germanic; North Germanic; West or East Scandinavian; Jämtland dialects

Language codes
- ISO 639-3: None (mis)
- Glottolog: jamt1238
- IETF: gmq-u-sd-sez
- Jämtland in northern Sweden

Jämtland dialects, or Jamtish (endonym: jamska [ˈjâmskɐ᷈]; Swedish: jämtska, jämtmål), are a group of North Germanic dialects spoken in the Swedish province of Jämtland. In the eastern part of Jämtland the dialects are transitional to those of Ångermanland. The dialect group is commonly regarded and treated as a single entity. The Glottolog project considers it a language separate from Swedish, placing it closest to Norrlandic.

The dialects share many characteristics with Trøndersk — the dialect spoken to the west in Norwegian Trøndelag, and has historically sometimes been considered to be Norwegian in origin. The current view in Scandinavian dialectology, however, is that they belong in either the East or West Scandinavian branch.

== Name ==
The local name for the dialects is jamska. There is, however, no common term for the dialects in English, and academic sources call them by various names, such as jamska, jämtska, Jämtish dialect, Jämtlandic dialect, Jämtland dialects or dialects of Jämtland.

The endonym jamska is technically a definite form; the indefinite form jaamsk/jamske is rarely used.

== Characteristics ==
=== Vowel balance ===
Like all other central Scandinavian dialects (Trønder dialects, east Norwegian dialects, Norrland dialects, some Finland Swedish dialects), the most characteristic feature of the Jämtland dialects is vowel balance, an event that caused the vowel endings after heavy syllables to weaken and later even drop entirely in some dialects moving the tone over from ending to the root syllable, example Old Norse kasta [kʰɑ̂stɑ᷈] > [kʰɑ̂stə᷈] (> [kʰɑ̂.ɑ᷈st] "to throw"), while the endings after light syllables instead were reinforced, and even caused a type of umlaut or vowel harmony on the root vowel (example Old Norse lifa [liβɑ] > [liβɑˑ] > [le̞ʋa] > [lɐ̂ʋɐ᷈] "to live"). According to one theory, this phenomenon has its roots in influence from the neighbouring Saami languages in medieval times.

=== Prosody ===
The Old Norse phonemic contrast of light and heavy syllables is partly preserved in eastern Jämtland dialects, and to some degree in Western Jämtland dialects and in the Oviken parish in southwestern Jämtland. In eastern Jämtland and in Oviken parish, short stressed syllables are preserved from Old Norse words like hǫku 'chin', lifa 'to live', which have evolved to [hô̞ke̞᷈] in Fors parish, [hɔ̂ke̞᷈] in Ragunda and Stugun parishes, [hɞ̂kɛ᷈] in Hällesjö parish, and [hôkɵ᷈] in Oviken parish, while lifa has become [læ̂ʋa᷈] or similar in all of the parishes. In western Jämtland, the short syllables are less stable, and are often lengthened to long or half-long in accent 2 words, but is preserved in accent 1 words: Old Norse svið 'burned' has become [sʋɛ̂] in Åre parish, while accent 2 words like Old Norse lofa 'to promise', duna 'to make noise', which have evolved to [lɔ̂ˑʋo̞᷈] or [lɔ̂ːʋɔ᷈], and [d̪ɔ̂ːnɔ᷈] in Undersåker, Kall and Åre parishes.

=== Primary and secondary diphthongs ===
Central- and southwestern Jämtland dialects have preserved the Old Norse primary diphthongs ai, au, ey, usually with pronunciations like [e̞i̯], [ɞɵ̯], [œy̯]. In the Offerdal parish in western Jämtland, ai and ey have monophthongized to [ɛː] and [œː], while au is preserved as [æɵ̯]. Eastern Jämtland dialects (spoken in the parishes Borgvattnet, Ragunda, Fors, Stugun, Håsjö, Hällesjö) have no diphthongs, but have monophthongized ai to [e̝ː], ey to [ø̝ː], and au to [ɵː], [ɞː], [ʌː] or [o̞ː]. Southwestern Jämtland dialects have not only preserved the original diphthongs, but also, similar to Icelandic and some dialects in Norway, diphthongized Old Norse á to [ɑu̯] in Myssjö parish, [ɔu̯] in Hackås and Oviken parishes, and [aɔ̯] in Berg and Rätan parishes.

=== Voiceless L ===
The Jämtland dialects, like Icelandic, Faroese, and other northern Scandinavian dialects, have both a voiced [l] and voiceless [ɬ] l-sound. This sound comes from a voiced l that has been partly assimilated by either a preceding s or t, or a following t: Old Norse kirtilinn 'gland' has become [tɕʰɑ̂ːɬ̠l̠n̠᷈], [tɕʰɑ̂ɬ̠ːl̠n̠᷈] or similar, Old Norse slíta 'to struggle, to pull' has become [ɬlît̪e̞᷈], [ɬlîi᷈ːt̪] or similar, and Old Norse allt 'all' has become [aɬt] or similar.

== Orthography ==
There have been attempts to standardize the orthography of the Jämtland dialects. The attempt that has been the most popular is Vägledning för stavning av jamska (1994 and 1995) which is the work of the committee Akademien för jamska consisting of Bodil Bergner, Berta Magnusson and Bo Oscarsson. The most prominent application of this orthography has been to prepare translations of parts of the Bible into the dialect, resulting in the book Nagur Bibelteksta på jamska. An excerpt:

Genesis 1:26–27:

^{26}Å Gud saa: 'Lätt oss gjära når mänish, nager som e lik oss. Å dom ske rå öve fishn derri havan å över foglan pyne himmela, å öve tamdjura öve heile jola, å öve all de djur som kravl å rör se på jorn.'

^{27}Å Gud skapa mänishan å gjool som n avbild ta se själv. Te kær å kviin skapa n dom.

The book does not fully follow Vägledning för stavning av jamska. For example, using Vägledning för stavning av jamska one would spell gjæra v. 'do; make', not "gjära". Another spelling convention in Nagur Bibelteksta på jamska is the use of the digraph "sh", in e.g. "mänish" n. 'human being' and "fishn" n. 'the fish', with the same pronunciation as English 'sh' in 'shoe'. Properly using Vägledning för stavning av jamska, this would be spelled sch; see § 26 in the external link below. People writing Jämtland dialects commonly use the letters of the Swedish alphabet, with the addition of æ and ô. The letters c, q, w, x, and z are usually not used.
