= Nyborg, Sweden =

Nyborg
- Location within Norrbotten Location within Sweden
- Coordinates: 65°47′N 23°12′E
- Country: Sweden
- Province: Norrbotten
- County: Norrbotten County
- Municipality: Kalix Municipality

Area
  - Total: 1.70 km^{2} (0.66 sq mi)

Population (31 December 2010)
  - Total: 833
  - Density: 491/km^{2} (1,270/sq mi)
- Time zone: UTC+1 (CET)
  - Summer (DST): UTC+2 (CEST)

Nyborg is a locality situated in Kalix Municipality, Norrbotten County, Sweden with 833 inhabitants in 2010. Their bandy club is called Nyborgs SK.

Nyborg was originally the name of a now disfunct saw mill, but has become used for the two villages Ytterbyn and Målsön which are so close together that they count as one locality.
