= Värmländska =

Värmländska refers to the indigenous speech varieties of the traditional Swedish province of Värmland. It is one of the dialects that form the group Götamål, as opposed to Sveamål, South Swedish dialects, Norrland dialects, Gutnish and Finland-Swedish dialects, in an often used classification of Swedish dialects.

The traditional province of Värmland, defined as Värmland County plus the two adjacent municipalities Karlskoga and Degerfors, in March 2017 had a population of 319,675. However, any attempt to put a number on speakers of a Swedish dialect in the modern situation is likely to be contested. What counts as Värmländska is a matter of definition. If we were to define it as a speech variety that has a grammatical system clearly distinct from Standard Swedish — such as for example a consistently made distinction between the three grammatical genders (see below) — the number will be relatively small and mostly consisting of elderly speakers. On the other hand, if we define it on more phonological grounds — such as having a vowel sound [ɶ] and having a reduced schwa-like vowel sound in many word endings which in Standard Swedish have 'a' — we will in all likelihood include a majority of people living in Värmland, i.e. more than 150,000 people.

== Phonology ==
=== Characteristic features ===
One feature setting Värmländska apart from most other Swedish dialects is the existence of a vowel phoneme pronounced [ɶ] or [ɞ] (often written as 'ô'), existing both as a long vowel as in e.g. sôve [sɞ:və] (=to sleep) and as a short vowel as in kôrv [kʰɶɾv] (=sausage).

The vowel phoneme /ø:/ typically does not have the allophone [œ:] found in Standard Swedish and many other dialects before 'r' (compare for example Värmländska [fø:rə] with Standard Swedish [fœ:rə] for före (=before)).

Word-final 'a' in Old Norse words has generally been reduced to schwa [ə] in southern varieties and dropped altogether in northern varieties. This can be seen in the uninflected forms of many feminine nouns and in the infinitive form of verbs. A similar reduction of 'a' can be seen in the present tense verb suffix -ar and in the plural noun suffix -ar. It has resulted in a consistent conflation of Swedish suffixes -er and -ar to just -er in all but a few varieties of Värmländska.

However, this does not mean that Värmländska has no full, unreduced vowels in word endings, because there have been secondary developments of suffixes with 'a' in them:

1) The loss of the ending -de in the past form of the largest group of weak verbs has in some varieties led to a contrast such as for example past tense härma (=imitated) as distinct from the infinitive härme (=to imitate). However, in the central varieties of Värmländska, the past tense ending has also been reduced to a schwa.

2) A process whereby the definite suffix for singular feminine nouns has developed into -a, as can be seen in for example natta (=the night) as opposed to natt (=night).

3) A process similar to 2) above whereby the definite suffix for plural neuter nouns has developed into -a, as can be seen in for example orginala (=the eccentric people) as opposed to orginal (=an eccentric person).

The phenomena described under 2) and 3) above can be found even in varieties where word-final Old Norse 'a' has been dropped altogether.

=== Phonological variation within the province ===
Through the province goes a boundary between two distinct ways of pronouncing the consonant sound /ɧ/, represented in Swedish orthography by 'sj', 'stj', 'skj' etc. To the west of Väse the sound is always a retroflex sibilant [ʂ], whereas to the east it is usually a velar fricative [x].

The use of two distinct allophones of the phoneme /r/, a phenomenon commonly known as 'götamåls-r' because of its use in the provinces of Västergötland and Östergötland, can be found in the southeastern part of the province. In those areas word-initial /r/ as in for example rektit (and usually also long /r:/ as in for example herre) is pronounced as [ʁ] instead of [ɾ].

== Grammar ==
Värmländska has preserved the Proto-Indo-European three-gender system for nouns. This can be seen in:

1) The use of personal pronouns han, ho and dä for masculine, feminine and neutral nouns respectively, e.g. referring to masculine himlen (=the sky) as han and to feminine skattskrivinga (=the registration for tax purposes) as ho.

2) The use of distinct feminine forms of possessive pronouns and articles, typically lacking the consonant 'n', where Standard Swedish uses the masculine forms. Examples include mi mamma (=my mother) vs. min ti (=my time), which in Standard Swedish both would have min, and e moster (=an aunt) vs. en mugg (=a mug), which in Standard Swedish both would have en, as well as tjärringa (=the woman) vs. gubben (=the man), which in Standard Swedish both would have the definite suffix -en.

The imperative of the verb is simply formed by dropping the -e from the infinitive (in the varieties which have kept this infinitive ending — see above). In contrast, the imperative in Standard Swedish is identical to the verb stem, which in the majority of verbs ends with -a, making it identical to the infinitive.

In most parts of the province only one suffix corresponds to the Standard Swedish suffixes -arna, -erna and -orna for plural non-neuter nouns. In most of southern Värmland it is -era and in northern Värmland it is some variant of -an, while parts of western Värmland have -era for feminine nouns and -ane for masculine ones.

== Vocabulary ==
A few examples of differences in vocabulary between Värmländska and Standard Swedish include:

gôtt vs. Standard Swedish härligt (=nice, great, wonderful — note that Standard Swedish gott has a much narrower semantic range)

i môra vs. Standard Swedish i morgon (=tomorrow)

dret (cognate with English dirt) vs. Standard Swedish skit (=shit)

stri vs. Standard Swedish bråka, tjata (=argue, nag)

the prefix gôr- to indicate very — compare Standard Swedish jätte-

jämt vs. Standard Swedish just, precis and nyss (an adverb that indicates that something occurs in close proximity in time or space to something else)

töli vs. standard Swedish jobbig (=laborious, tough, or annoying)

== Literature written in Värmländska ==
Styffe, Torleif (1997). Bibelord på Dalbymål (Stories from the Bible in the Dalby dialect). Montana förlag. ISBN 91-972111-7-6
