= Nyborgs SK =

Swedish sports club

- City: Nyborg, Sweden
- League: Division 1
- Division: Övre Norrland
- Founded: 10 March 1946; 79 years ago

Nyborgs Sportklubb, Nyborgs SK, is a sports club in Nyborg, Kalix, Sweden. The team colours are blue and white. The club was founded on 10 March 1946 and is active playing bandy and association football.

In May 1990, the senior bandy team of Nyborgs SK was combined with the bandy department of IFK Kalix and formed the new club Kalix/Nyborg BF, which in 2001 changed its name to Kalix BF. Nyborgs SK has since started its own senior bandy team again, but is still cooperating with Kalix BF.

The club has been playing in Allsvenskan, the second level bandy league in Sweden, during the seasons 2008/2009 and 2012/2013, but has apart from that been playing in the third level Division 1.
