= Gammelgården =

- Location within Norrbotten Location within Sweden
- Coordinates: 65°53′N 23°02′E
- Country: Sweden
- Province: Norrbotten
- County: Norrbotten County
- Municipality: Kalix Municipality

Area
  - Total: 0.53 km^{2} (0.20 sq mi)

Population (31 December 2010)
  - Total: 297
  - Density: 562/km^{2} (1,460/sq mi)
- Time zone: UTC+1 (CET)
  - Summer (DST): UTC+2 (CEST)

Gammelgården is a locality situated in Kalix Municipality, Norrbotten County, Sweden with 297 inhabitants in 2010.
