= Norrland dialects =

Group of dialects of northern Sweden

Norrland dialects (Swedish: norrländska mål) make up one of the six major dialect groupings of the Swedish language. It comprises most dialects traditionally spoken in Norrland, except for those of Gästrikland and southern Hälsingland, which are usually classified as Svealand Swedish, as well as some local dialects of Härjedalen and northernmost Jämtland, which are usually classified as a Norwegian dialect.

The border between Norrland dialects and Svealand Swedish runs through Hälsingland, such that the northern Hälsingland dialects are regarded as Norrland dialects and the southern ones as Svealand Swedish; an alternative delineation follows the southern border of Medelpad.

The old northern border of the Swedish language in coastal Norrbotten largely followed the eastern and northern borders of the present-day Kalix and Överkalix municipalities. From there, a vaguely defined linguistic border ran through Lappland from the northernmost point of Överkalix parish in an arc to the south of Porjus, then followed the Lule River to the border with Norway.

== History ==
Norrland dialects arose from the combined influence of the Old West Norse spoken in Trøndelag to the west and the Old East Norse spoken to the south. The westerly influences were notably strong in the centuries leading up to the Viking Age. The shift to East Norse progressed through the Middle Ages. As Norrland gradually came to be more and more under Central Swedish influence in the Modern Era, many of the older West Norse characteristics disappeared.

The strong West Norse influences can still be seen today in the toponymy of Norrland in placenames ending in -ånger (Swedish: vik, "harbour"). Parish names such Skön and Indal (both in Sundsvall Municipality) have West Nordic origins. The dialect of Norrbotten displays less West Nordic influence than other more westerly dialects. The greatest West Nordic/Norwegian, or perhaps least East Nordic/Swedish, influence is found in Jämtland.

As with other regiolects, it is difficult to clearly define a unique set of characteristics for the Norrland dialects. The distribution of different features of the dialect have differing boundaries (called isoglosses), which are described in the following summary of phenomena regarded as typical of Norrland dialects. In Norrland, traditional local dialects are on the decline as in many other parts of the world. Aside from characteristic peculiarities in intonation, there are certain grammatical traits that still survive: the infinitive måsta (Standard Swedish: måste), present tense forms such as han gå (Standard Swedish: han går, "he goes") and han ropa (Standard Swedish: han ropar, "he calls"), and the uninflected predicative in a statement such as dom ä trött (Standard Swedish: de är trötta, "they are tired").

== Features ==
=== Vowel balance and apocope ===
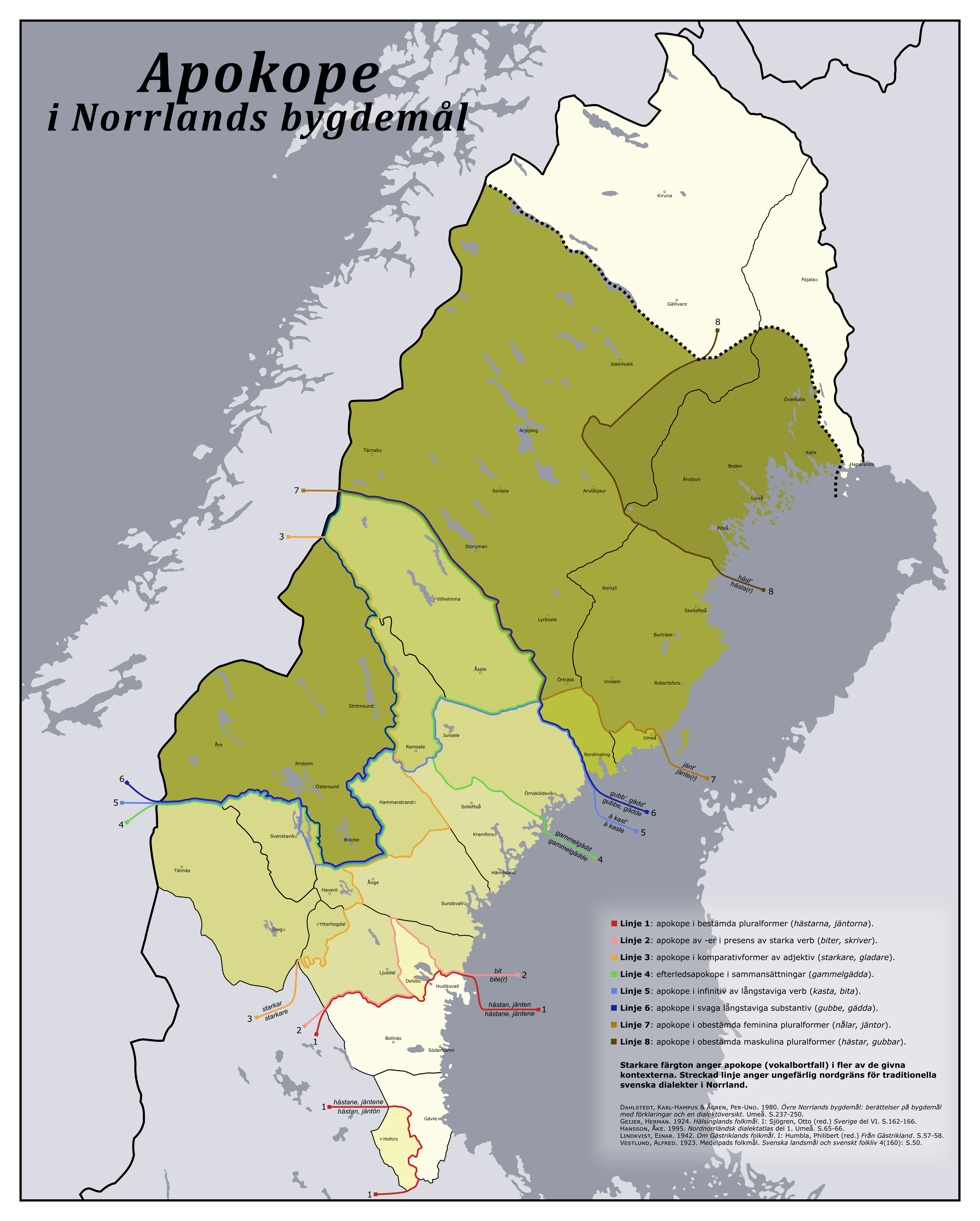
Apocope in the traditional dialects of Norrland, where a darker olive green indicates apocope in more phonological contexts.

Unlike present-day Standard Swedish, syllables in Old Swedish could be both light and heavy, and in the Norrland dialects the two syllable types developed in diverging ways, resulting in a number of phonological developments. In words with an original heavy syllable, the final vowel is often reduced or lost (apocope). The former is common in southern Norrland dialects, as in the infinitive ending of verbs (/a/ > /ə/ or /æ/), e.g. kaste ‘to throw’ (Standard Swedish kasta). The latter is common in northern Norrland dialects as well as in Jämtland, e.g. kast or more commonly kaast, with preserved double-peak pitch accent (so-called “circumflex” accent). In words with an original light syllable, no such reduction is found, e.g. taḷa ‘to speak’ (< Old Swedish tăla; Modern Standard Swedish tala). This weight-conditioned ending system is known in Swedish dialectology as vowel balance (Swedish vokalbalans).

Vowel balance is abundant throughout the grammatical system. Outside the infinitive of verbs, it is also found in the nominal system, where it affects for instance so-called weak masculines and weak feminines, e.g. Luleå dialect bääkk ‘hill’ (< OSw. oblique bakka; Mod.Sw. backe) vs. po:sa ‘bag’ (with lengthened root vowel, from OSw. pŭsa; Mod.Sw. påse); kḷookk ‘clock’ (< OSw. klokku; Mod.Sw. klocka) vs. lö:do ‘barn’ (< OSw. lăþu; Mod.Sw. lada).

Vowel balance is found in a large contiguous area in Northern Scandinavia. In Sweden it occurs in the entire Norrland dialect area with the exception of northern Hälsingland, in Härjedalen and in upper Dalarna. Outside of Sweden, it occurs in northern Ostrobothnia in Finland and in Østlandet, Trøndelag and parts of Nordland in Norway. It is also notably found in several East Swedish dialects in southern Finland and Estonia. The dialects of northern Hälsingland, like most northern Svea dialects and Standard Swedish, generally preserve the -a of Old Swedish, i.e. kasta. There is evidence to support that vowel balance was once a more geographically widespread phenomenon than in the early 20th century (when traditional dialects were still widely spoken). For instance, there are traces of vowel balance in Upper Swedish dialects, and in Old Swedish texts, vowel balance can be found as far south as eastern Småland.

The north Scandinavian apocope has a similar geographical distribution pattern, but is found further to the north, prototypically covering Lappland, Norrbotten and Västerbotten, as well as most of Jämtland and parts of northern Ångermanland. In Norway it covers Trøndelag and parts of Nordland and in Finland the northern part of Ostrobothnia. It is also found in other areas such as northern Värmland and Öland in Sweden, and Jutland in Denmark. General reduction of unstressed ending vowels is, by contrast, a more widespread phenomenon, also found in e.g. Östergötland and Småland as well as in Standard Bokmål Norwegian and Standard Danish.

It has been suggested by Russian linguist Jurij Kusmenko that the Scandinavian vowel balance arose in contact with Saami languages where a similar phenomenon was previously found. This hypothesis has, however, been deemed unconvincing by several scholars of Scandinavian languages.

=== Vowel harmony ===
In a subset of dialects with vowel balance, a process known as vowel harmony is found (also known as vowel levelling or vowel metaphony; Swedish tilljämning). Vowel harmony is restricted to words with an old light root syllable and is an assimilation of the root vowel and the ending vowel. The assimilation process is usually regressive, i.e. the root vowel adopts features from the ending vowel, although progressive assimilation is also found in dialects in Norway and Dalarna.

Vowel harmony has its center of intensity in Eastern Norway, Trøndelag and upper Dalarna, but is also found in Norrland dialects. For instance, the /a/ in Old Swedish oblique lăþu ‘barn’ has in many dialects been raised and rounded, e.g. in the Luleå dialect to /ø/: lödo, in Jämtland dialects with full assimilation to /ʉ/: ludu. In southern Västerbotten dialects, root vowel harmony with original /i/ is common, e.g. in past participles such as lissi ‘read’ (< OSw. læ̆sit) and skyri ‘cut’ (< OSw. skŭrit, skŏrit).

=== Retention of /a/ before /rð/ ===
In most Norrland dialects, Old Swedish /a/ has been preserved before the consonant cluster /rð/ (which, however, has changed into /ɽ/, a retroflex flap). This is unlike Standard Swedish, and the traditional dialects further to the south, where /a/ has shifted to /o/ in this context. Examples include Medelpad (Torp dialect) aḷ ‘ard’ (< OSw. arþer; Mod.Sw. årder) and svaḷ ‘pork rind’ (< OSw. svarþ; Mod.Sw. svål). Jämtland does not share this feature, having changed /a/ into /o/ (or /au̯ ~ ou̯/), as in Jämtland vååḷ ‘to become’ (< OSw. varþa).

Lexical exceptions exist to this rule, notably the word ‘farm’, which is gåḷ in most of Norrland (< OSw. garþer; Mod.Sw. gård), likely due to influence from the standard language. The retention of /a/ is also found in adjacent dialects in Ostrobothnia in Finland to the east, as well as in Dalecarlian and Norwegian dialects to the (south)west.

=== Medial palatalization ===
The Old Swedish initial velar consonants /ɡ/ and /k/, as well as the cluster /sk/ underwent palatalization before front vowels in almost all dialects of Swedish. In Norrland dialects unlike Standard Swedish, this change also took place in medial position, resulting in /ɡ/ > /j ~ dʑ/; /k/ > /tɕ/; /sk/ > /ʂ ~ stɕ/, e.g. Arnäs dialect (Ångermanland) rôjjen ‘the rye’ (< OSw. rŭgin; Mod.Sw. rågen); Älvsbyn dialect (Norrbotten) fåḷtje ‘the people’ (< OSw. folkit; Mod.Sw. folket); Burträsk dialect (Västerbotten) fissjen ‘the fish’ (< OSw. fiskin; Mod.Sw. fisken).

Medial palatalization is especially common in the definite form of masculine and neutral nouns, as shown above. However, in many dialects the change unproductive and has been gradually reversed due to analogy with other unpalatalised forms in the paradigm, hence the definite form of ‘the fish’ in the Burträsk dialect is either palatalized fissjin or unpalatalized fisken. In words where there are no related unpalatalized forms, palatalization is more robust, e.g. myttje ‘much’ (< OSw. mykit, Mod.Sw. mycket.)

The southern border for medial palatalization runs through Uppland, Västmanland and Värmland in Svealand. It is also found in Ostrobothnia and parts of Uusimaa (Nyland) in Finland, as well as parts of Norway. There are also indications that medial palatalization formerly reached even further south, into the archipelago of Södermanland and Östergötland.

=== Stress in compound words ===
In many Norrland dialects, the primary stress in compound words is placed on the second element, e.g. Ångermanland neverˈtak ‘birch roof’ or veaˈkast ‘wood pile’. This type of stress is especially found in Ångermanland and Norrbotten, but also further south in northern Uppland and Södertörn, as well as western Åland. Similar stress phenomena are found in western Uusimaa (Nyland) in Finland, as well as in Skåne and southern Halland.

=== Use of the definite form ===
Norrland dialects are known for using the definite form for more grammatical functions than does Standard Swedish, where the corresponding form is often a bare noun.

A primary use of the definite article is with non-count nouns and nouns denoting an unlimited quantity. For this reason, Lars-Olof Delsing calls this use of the definite form “partitive”, since the partitive use is similar to e.g. the French partitive, while Östen Dahl calls this non-delimited use. Examples of this usage include Arnäs dialect (Ångermanland) såddä svejjrôgen ‘sowed burn-beaten rye’ (Standard Swedish sådde svedjeråg); Skellefteå (northern Västerbotten) väärm mjölka ‘heat milk’ (Standard Swedish värma mjölk). This use of the definite form is common in dialects in Västerbotten, Norrbotten, Ångermanland, Jämtland as well as in the settler dialects of Lapland. There are also attested examples from Medelpad. In addition, it is also common in Ovansiljan in northern Dalarna, as well as in Ostrobothnia in Finland.

Furthermore, the definite form is also used in generic statements, i.e. when a general statement is made about the entity the noun phrase refers to, e.g. beavers build dams or gold is expensive. This usage also includes “citation uses”, e.g. Ersmark dialect (northern Västerbotten) he kall ve fö sjanostn ‘this we call sand cheese’. This usage of the definite form is even more widespread and apart from the areas listed above, it is also found in Värmland, southern Finland and parts of Norway.

Dahl also lists a number of other contexts where the definite article is used, including after quantifiers, e.g. Sorsele dialect (southern Västerbotten) tre brödren ‘three brothers’ (Standard Swedish tre bröder); with so called “low referential” singular count nouns, e.g. Burträsk dialect (northern Västerbotten) vi hadd hästn ‘we had a horse’ (Standard Swedish vi hade häst). In cases like these, the referent is not important but rather the property of owning a horse. In addition, the definite is also often used in instrumental phrases, e.g. Bjurholm dialect (Västerbotten–Ångermanland transitional) ät såppa ve skea ‘eats soup with a spoon’ (Standard Swedish äter soppa med sked), as well as a few other cases.

=== Present tense of verbs ===
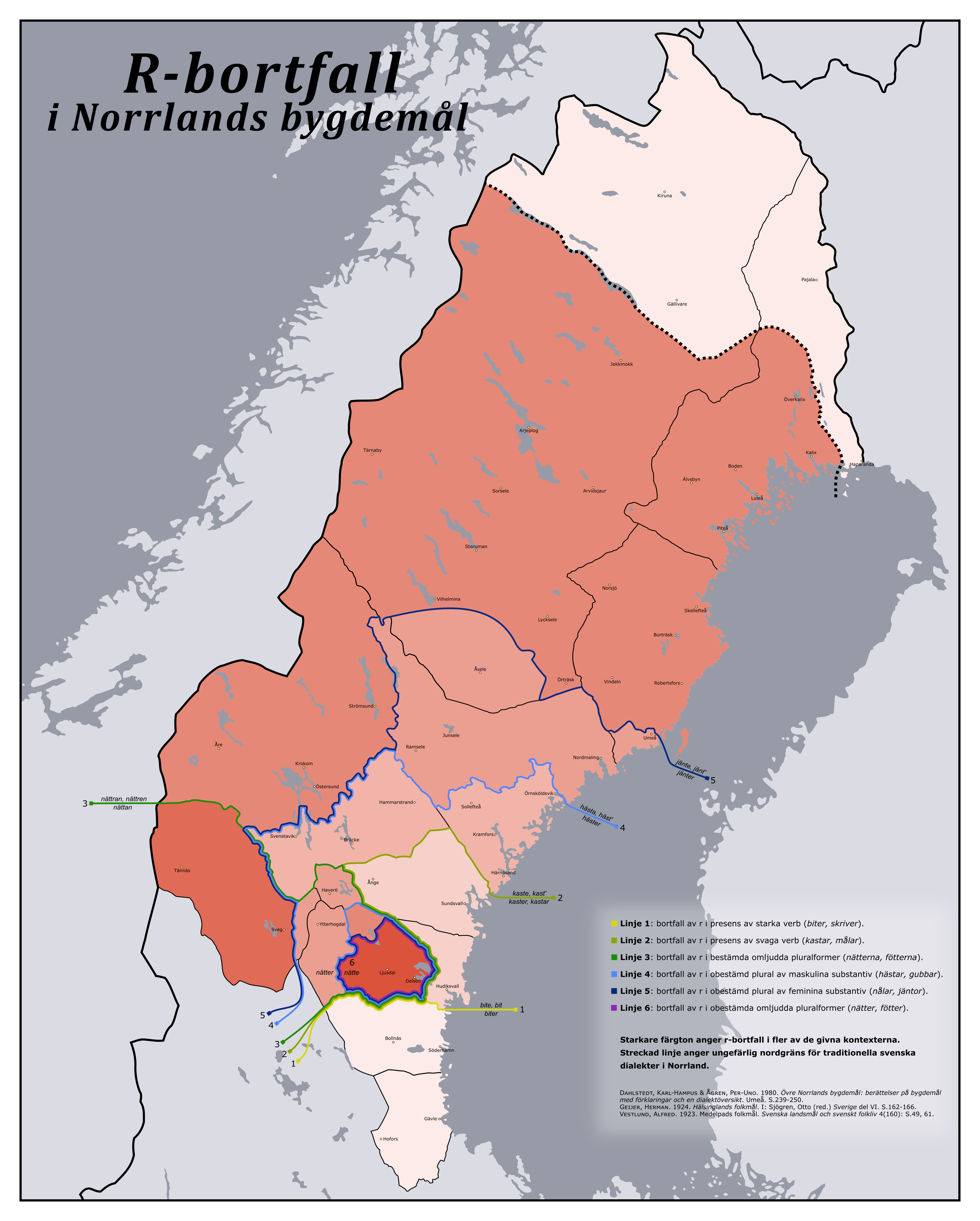
Loss of /r/ in traditional dialects in Norrland, including loss of the present tense ending -er (isogloss line 1, yellow).

In the present tense of strong verbs, the ending -er is lost, e.g. han bit ‘he bites’ (Standard Swedish han biter); han spring ‘he runs’ (Standard Swedish han springer). This is characteristic for all traditional Norrland dialects, and the southern border for runs through Hälsingland, so that northern Hälsingland has han bit, but southern han bite. This feature is also found in northern Dalarna and Trøndelag in Norway.

=== Adjective incorporation ===
While adjective–noun compounds are possible in all Scandinavian varieties, Norrland dialects tend to form compounds with adjectives more frequently, and with a semantic difference. Contrasting den nya bilen ‘the new car’ with the compounded form nybilen in Standard Swedish, the compound may only have the reading “the recently fabricated car”, not “the car I just bought (in contrast to my old car)”. In Norrland dialect that employ adjective incorporation however, this is only true for the indefinite form, while the definite nybiln can also refer to a new car contrasted to the speaker's old car.

Adjective incorporation may also occur when the adjective represent a more occasional rather than inherent property of the noun, hence Nederkalix dialect (Norrbotten) litn artibåt ‘nice little boat’, lilfåtiståkkar ‘poor little thing’; Vilhelmina dialect (southern Västerbotten) tôkken gammstygggûbb ‘such an ugly old man’.

Adjective incorporation is found in all Norrland dialects, as well as in northern Dalarna. It is also found to some extent in Ostrobothnia in Finland and in Trøndelag in Norway.

=== Preproprial articles ===
A preproprial article is an article used before proper names, and works like a definite article for both first names, surnames, as well as kinship terms in Norrland dialects.

In Norrland dialects, the form of the article is usually identical to the unstressed forms of the 3rd person personal pronouns, from which they are also historically derived: (e)n in the masculine, and a in the feminine, e.g. n Erik or a Anna. In many dialects the article is indeclinable, but in many dialects with a dative case, it has a dative form as well.

The preproprial article is used when the proper name functions as an argument and in identifying predicatives: de här ä n Erik ‘this is Erik’, but not when it functions as a predicate with the verbs heta ‘to be named’ and kallas ‘to be called’: han het (*en) Erik ‘his name is Erik’, nor in vocative constructions: (*a) Anna, vars ä du ‘Anna, where are you?’.

The preproprial article is obligatory in all traditional dialects in Norrland except for the southernmost regions of Hälsingland and Gästrikland. It is also found in western Dalarna and in northern Värmland. It is also common in most parts of Norway, except the very south.

== Subgrouping ==
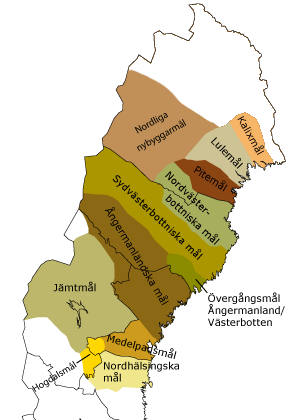
Geography of Norrland dialects according to Karl-Hampus Dahlstedt and Per-Uno Ågren from 1954

Below is a list of common subdialectal divisions of Norrland dialects, beginning in the north and ending in the south.

=== Settler dialects ===
The so-called "settler dialects" (Swedish: nybyggarmål) comprise all the Swedish dialects in Lappland; Karl-Hampus Dahlstedt geographically defines this dialect to those inland parts of Norrbotten where the Swedish dialects do not fit in with any of the relatively more clearly defined dialects of the coastal regions, due to the patchwork ancestry of the Swedish-speaking settlers that populated the area. One typical "settler dialect" is found in Arjeplog, which arose from a blending of Standard Swedish with the Piteå and Umeå dialects. There is also Sami influence on these dialects, such as the absence of the "thick L", which is generally typical of Norrland dialects. Another area in which a "settler dialect" is spoken is Malmfälten.

Swedish came to the Lappmark in the 18th and 19th centuries as ethnic Swedes began to settle the area. They came from many different regions, and some even spoke Finnish or a Sami language natively. This resulted in a blending of both dialects and languages. Most of the Lappmark dialects thus lack such archaic features as the dative case and diphthongs that the dialects of the coastal parishes have retained. Nevertheless, the differences between the various Lappmark dialects can be considerable, depending on the heritage of those who settled in a given area. A notable number of Sami loanwords have found their way into the dialects of Lappmark and the areas just to the south. For instance, the Siberian jay is locally called koxik as opposed to the Standard Swedish lavskrika.

=== Kalix ===
The Kalix dialects (Swedish: kalixmål) are spoken in the medieval Kalix parishes (present-day Kalix and Överkalix municipalities). Like other dialects in Norrbotten, the Kalix dialects retain numerous archaic features. Many Old Norse diphthongs have been preserved, as well as archaic consonant clusters such as sj, stj and lj. The dative case is also retained, including following a preposition. Additionally, verbs at least partially retain their old plural forms.

The Kalix dialects are divided into

- Överkalix dialect (överkalixmål)
- Nederkalix dialect (nederkalixmål)

One difference between these two varieties is that the old consonant clusters mb, nd, and ng have been retained in Överkalix, but not in Nederkalix. For example, the Standard Swedish kam ("comb" or "crest") is kemb in Överkalix, but kap in Nederkalix. Furthermore, the Överkalix dialect has more influences from Sami languages and Meänkieli.

=== Luleå ===
The Luleå dialects (Swedish: lulemål) are spoken in and around the mediaeval parish of Luleå (present-day Boden and Luleå municipalities). They are also spoken in the easternmost parts of Lule lappmark up to near Vuollerim.

These dialects may be further subdivided as follows

- Lower Luleå dialect (in Lower Luleå parish)
- Upper Luleå dialect (in Upper Luleå parish)
- Råneå dialect (in Råneå parish)

The Luleå dialects are known for, among other things, a rich inventory of diphthongs. The Old Norse ai, au, and öy are preserved, as well as ei (e.g., stein for Standard Swedish sten, meaning "stone"), eo (e.g., heok for Standard Swedish hök, meaning hawk), and oi (e.g., hoi for Standard Swedish hö, meaning "hay"). These dialects also have a number of vowels that differ from Standard Swedish. For example, Standard Swedish i becomes öi (röis instead of Standard ris, meaning "rice"), while Standard u becomes eo or eu (heos instead of Standard hus, meaning "house").

=== Piteå ===
The Piteå dialects (Swedish: pitemål) are spoken in the area of the mediaeval Piteå parish (present-day Piteå and Älvsbyn municipalities) as well as in the southernmost parts of Jokkmokk Municipality and in northern Arvidsjaur Municipality in Pite lappmark. These dialects also preserve a number of archaic features, such as conserved diphthongs in words like göuk (Standard Swedish: gök, "cuckoo bird") and stein (Standard Swedish: sten, "stone"). The consonant clusters mb, nd, and ng are often retained, for example in kamb (Standard Swedish: kam, "comb"). Unique to the Piteå dialects is that Old Swedish long "a" (modern "å") has become short "a" before "n", but nowhere else. Thus, lan (Standard Swedish: lån, "loan"), but båt (Standard Swedish: båt, "boat").

=== North and south Västerbotten ===
Northern Västerbotten dialects (Swedish: nordvästerbottniska mål) are spoken in the northern parts of Västerbotten, primarily the mediaeval Skellefteå parish (including Norsjö), together with a part of Pite lappmark (Malå and Arvidsjaur). Just like the coastal dialects of Norrbotten, the Northern Västerbotten dialects preserve numerous archaic features. The dative case is still used, not only after prepositions but also after certain adjectives and verbs. Old Norse diphthongs have been preserved in many local dialects, but have developed in different, unique ways. For instance, Standard Swedish öra ("ear") can be ööyr, ääyr, or aajr in various local dialects of Northern Västerbotten.

Southern Västerbotten dialects (Swedish: sydvästerbottniska mål) are spoken along the Ume River from Umeå to Tärna and Sorsele, including Bygdeå and Holmön. A dialect is spoken in Lycksele lappmark which is highly reminiscent of dialects spoken in Umeå, Vännäs, and Degerfors (Vindeln). These influences become less apparent approaching the Norwegian border, but are still strong as far as Tärna, where an old Umeå substratum is evident. The local dialect of Sorsele is influenced by the Northern Västerbotten dialects as well. The Southern Västerbotten dialects also preserve archaic diphthongs, for instance in bein (Standard Swedish: ben, "leg") and ööys (Standard Swedish: ösa, "to scoop"). This is a characteristic that distinguishes the Southern Västerbotten dialects from the dialects of Nordmaling and Bjurholm to the south as well as a shared feature with the Northern Västerbotten dialects. One difference between the Southern and Northern Västerbotten dialects is that in the Southern group, a "g" is often inserted between the old diphthong "au" and a following an "r" or "thick L". For example, Southern ôger is aur in the Northern dialects (Standard Swedish: ör, "gravelly ground").

=== Transitional dialects between Ångermanland and Västerbotten ===
These dialects, intermediate between the Southern Västerbotten dialects and the Ångermanland dialect, are spoken in Nordmaling and Bjurholm as well as Örträsk. These dialects are similar to the dialect of nolaskogs, such as in the change of Old Norse hv- to gv- (gvit as opposed to Standard Swedish vit, meaning "white").

=== Ångermanland ===
The Ångermanland dialects (Swedish: ångermanländska mål) are spoken in Ångermanland (with the exception of Nordmaling and Bjurholm) and Åsele lappmark. The dialects of Åsele and Vilhelmina have largely retained their Ångermanland character while still developing into their own. One exception is Fredrika parish, which developed a speech closer to Standard Swedish as a result of lying near major immigration routes from Ångermanland. The dialect of Dikanäs in Vilhelmina municipality is a transitional dialect between Ångermanland and the dialects of Lycksele lappmark.

The Ångermanland dialects may be further subdivided as follows:

- Dialects of Åsele lappmark
  - Vilhelmina dialect
- Nolaskogs dialect
- Dialects of Ådalen

=== Jämtland ===
The Jämtland dialects (Swedish: jämtmål, jämtska) comprise the dialects of Jämtland, with the exception of upper Frostviken, where the so-called Lid dialect (Lidmålet) is spoken. These dialects are to a greater extent than other Norrland dialects caught between eastern (i.e., Swedish) and western (i.e., Norwegian) linguistic influences. For example, the vowel u in words such as bu (Standard Swedish: bod, "hut"; cf. Norwegian: bu) and ku (Standard Swedish: ko, "cow"; cf. Norwegian: ku). The Jämtland dialects, like other Norrland dialects, also retain the archaic diphthongs of Old Norse.

=== Medelpad ===
The Medelpad dialects (Swedish: medelpadsmål) are spoken in Medelpad, with the exception of the westernmost parish of Haverö, where the Hogdal dialects are spoken. In comparison to other Norrland dialects, the Medelpad dialects are relatively uniform. The most important outer isogloss is the one with the Hälsing dialects to the south, which defines the limits of the "vowel balance" characteristic of Norrland dialects. One characteristic that distinguishes the Medelpad dialects (for example, Indal–Liden) from other nearby dialects is the pronunciation of both short and long i and y as the same, the so-called "Viby I". In Borgsjö and Torp, y is pronounced as i, while ö is pronounced closer to e. This trait is also found in the Hälsing dialects and in parts of Härjedalen. Other traits are shared with the Ångermanländ dialects, like the "thick n" sound after long vowels in words such as van ("experienced", "habituated to") and måne ("moon"). In the northernmost pars of Medelpad, the dialects show notable influence from Jämtland. A characteristic typical for dialects of coastal Medelpad is short u in place of standard ö.

=== Hogdal ===
These dialects are spoken in Haverö and Ytterhogdal.

=== Northern Hälsingland ===
The commonly accepted isogloss between Norrland dialects and Svealand Swedish runs through Hälsingland. This area, however, is a typical transition region. From A Svealand standpoint, there are reasons to define the isogloss as coinciding with the southern border of Hälsingland (through Ödmården). From a Norrland standpoint, there are alternative reasons to define it as coinciding with the southern border of Medelpad, which would fit with the southern limit of vowel balance.

Included in the Hälsingland dialects are the Hassela dialect (Swedish: hasselamål) and the Forsa dialect (Swedish: forsamål).
