= Kalix Municipality =

Kalix Municipality Kalix kommun
- Municipality
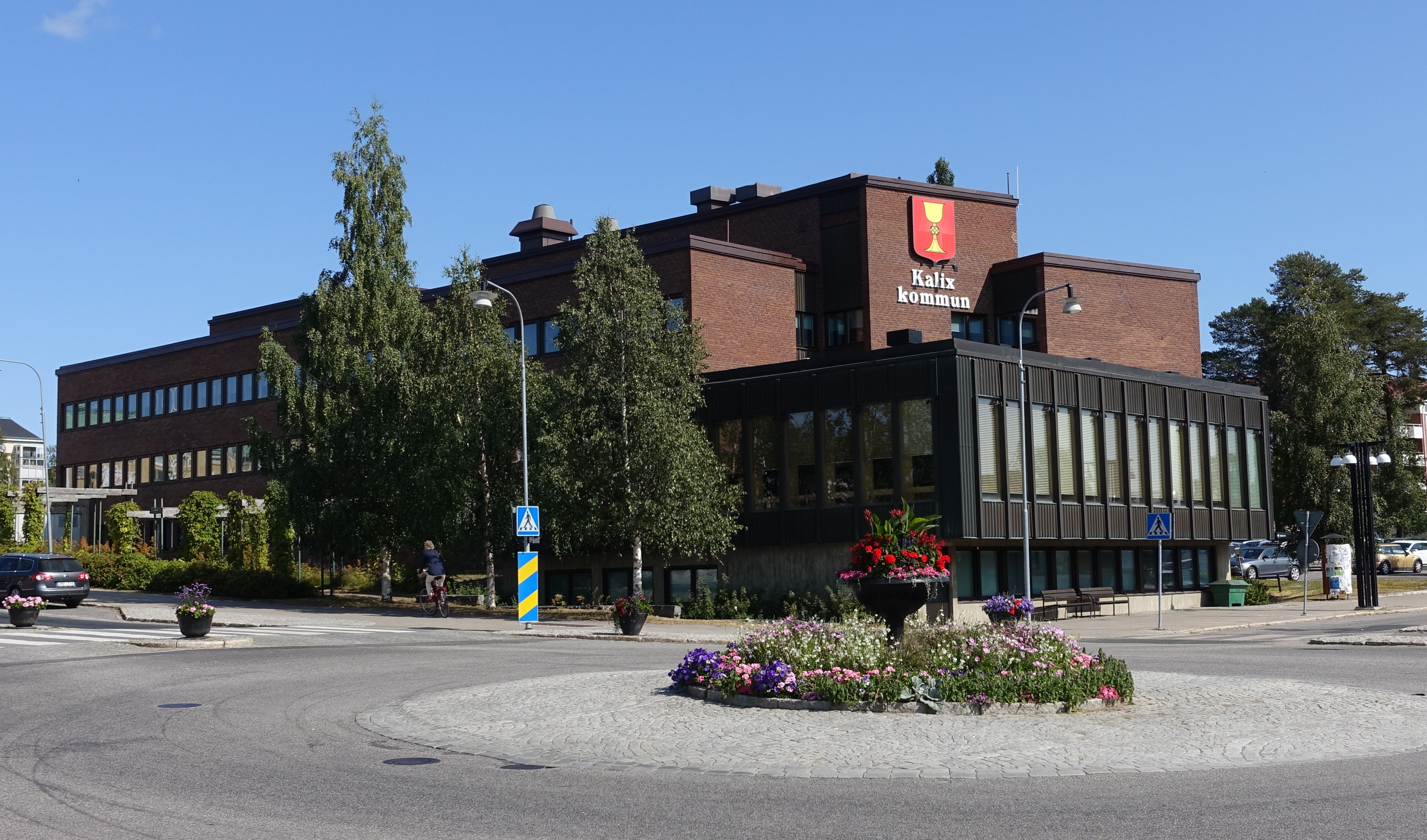
- Kalix municipal building

- Coat of arms

- Coordinates: 65°51′N 23°10′E
- Country: Sweden
- County: Norrbotten County
- Seat: Kalix

Area
  - Total: 3,712.06 km^{2} (1,433.23 sq mi)
  - Land: 1,807.67 km^{2} (697.95 sq mi)
  - Water: 1,904.39 km^{2} (735.29 sq mi)
- Area as of 1 January 2014.

Population (30 June 2025)
  - Total: 15,366
  - Density: 8.5004/km^{2} (22.016/sq mi)
- Time zone: UTC+1 (CET)
  - Summer (DST): UTC+2 (CEST)
- ISO 3166 code: SE
- Province: Norrbotten
- Municipal code: 2514
- Website: www.kalix.se

Kalix Municipality (Swedish: Kalix kommun; Meänkieli: Kaihnuun kunta; Finnish: Kalixin kunta) is a municipality in Norrbotten County in northern Sweden. Its seat is located in Kalix.

In 1924 Töre Municipality was detached from Nederkalix Municipality, forming a municipality of its own. In 1967 the two units were reunified, and the present municipality was created.

== History ==
In historical times, Kalix was the name of the court district (Swedish: domsaga) Kalix Lower Court District. It covered two parishes: Nederkalix and Överkalix (literally Lower Kalix and Upper Kalix, respectively). The chalice on the coat of arms was present in the Nederkalix coat of arms in 1800, and was incorporated into that of Kalix Municipality in 1989. The choice of symbol originates from the similarity between the Latin root of chalice, calix, mug (itself borrowed from Greek kalyx, κάλυξ, shell, husk) and the local Sami pronunciation of Gáláseatnu, an ancient name for the Kalix River.

== Localities ==
There are twelve localities (or urban areas) in Kalix Municipality:

#	Locality	Population
1	**Kalix**	7,312
2	Töre	1,146
3	Rolfs	1,116
4	Nyborg	881
5	Risögrund	782
6	Sangis	612
7	Karlsborg	419
8	Bredviken	374
9	Båtskärsnäs	340
10	Gammelgården	307
11	Morjärv	297
12	Påläng	291

The municipal seat in bold

== Demographics ==
This is a demographic table based on Kalix Municipality's electoral districts in the 2022 Swedish general election sourced from SVT's election platform, in turn taken from SCB official statistics.

In total there were 15,753 residents, including 12,447 Swedish citizens of voting age. 55.9% voted for the left coalition and 43.2% for the right coalition. Indicators are in percentage points except population totals and income.

Location	Residents	Citizen adults	Left vote	Right vote	Employed	Swedish parents	Foreign heritage	Income SEK	Degree
Location			%	%					
Gammelgården	1,359	1,109	59.1	39.4	82	90	10	23,335	33
Innanbäcken	1,837	1,396	55.7	43.6	86	92	8	27,645	37
Kalix C	1,866	1,622	61.5	37.7	76	81	19	21,299	26
Kalix V	1,714	1,418	59.2	40.0	78	85	15	23,032	30
Näsbyn	2,043	1,469	58.6	40.7	76	76	24	23,409	29
Risön	1,339	1,037	50.1	49.1	81	86	14	25,535	30
Sangis	1,165	944	52.4	46.2	81	86	14	23,710	28
Stenbäcken	1,690	1,254	56.0	43.3	87	90	10	26,792	32
Töre	1,324	1,042	49.0	50.2	81	86	14	23,152	23
Ytterbyn	1,416	1,156	53.8	45.7	85	92	8	26,322	31
Source: SVT

== Elections ==
=== Riksdag ===
These are the results of the elections to the Riksdag since the 1972 municipal reform. Norrbotten Party also contested the 1994 election but due to the party's small size at a nationwide level, SCB did not publish the party's results at a municipal level. The same applies to the Sweden Democrats between 1988 and 1998. "Turnout" denotes the percentage of eligible voters casting any ballots, whereas "Votes" denotes the number of actual valid ballots cast.

Year	Turnout	Votes	V	S	MP	C	L	KD	M	SD	ND	NP/SP
1973	93.1	11,817	8.5	61.1	0.0	18.3	3.3	1.0	7.1	0.0	0.0	0.0
1976	93.7	12,606	7.2	62.0	0.0	17.8	4.0	1.1	7.2	0.0	0.0	0.0
1979	92.5	12,757	5.5	62.3	0.0	15.4	4.3	1.1	8.4	0.0	0.0	0.0
1982	92.2	13,091	5.8	65.2	0.9	13.0	2.5	1.3	9.7	0.0	0.0	0.0
1985	90.4	12,982	5.8	66.2	0.8	11.3	6.7	0.0	9.3	0.0	0.0	0.0
1988	86.8	12,371	6.3	64.6	3.4	9.9	6.1	1.5	7.0	0.0	0.0	0.0
1991	86.4	12,375	6.2	62.4	2.2	8.7	6.0	3.3	8.8	0.0	2.1	0.0
1994	88.6	12,721	8.6	66.3	2.8	6.9	4.0	1.6	8.6	0.0	0.4	0.0
1998	82.4	11,459	18.1	52.9	4.2	5.8	2.8	5.0	10.3	0.0	0.0	0.0
2002	82.2	11,126	10.1	53.3	8.7	6.1	4.9	3.9	6.3	0.0	0.0	5.6
2006	82.0	10,924	7.0	59.9	4.7	7.0	3.3	3.3	10.3	1.7	0.0	0.8
2010	84.4	11,102	6.4	59.3	5.3	4.9	3.7	2.2	14.1	3.6	0.0	0.0
2014	85.3	10,979	6.3	55.7	4.1	4.7	2.4	2.1	11.5	11.5	0.0	0.0

Blocs

This lists the relative strength of the socialist and centre-right blocs since 1973, but parties not elected to the Riksdag are inserted as "other", including the Sweden Democrats results from 1988 to 2006, but also the Christian Democrats pre-1991 and the Greens in 1982, 1985 and 1991. The sources are identical to the table above. The coalition or government mandate marked in bold formed the government after the election. New Democracy got elected in 1991 but are still listed as "other" due to the short lifespan of the party.

Year	Turnout	Votes	Left	Right	SD	Other	Elected
1973	93.1	11,817	**69.6**	28.7	0.0	1.7	98.3
1976	93.7	12,606	69.2	**29.0**	0.0	3.8	96.2
1979	92.5	12,757	67.8	**28.1**	0.0	4.1	95.9
1982	92.2	13,091	**71.0**	25.2	0.0	3.8	96.2
1985	90.4	12,982	**72.0**	27.3	0.0	0.7	99.3
1988	86.8	12,371	**74.3**	23.0	0.0	2.7	97.3
1991	86.4	12,375	68.6	**26.8**	0.0	4.6	97.5
1994	88.6	12,721	**77.7**	21.1	0.0	1.1	98.9
1998	82.4	11,459	**75.2**	23.9	0.0	0.9	99.1
2002	82.2	11,126	**72.1**	21.2	0.0	7.7	92.3
2006	82.0	10,924	71.6	**23.9**	0.0	4.5	95.5
2010	84.4	11,102	71.0	**24.9**	3.6	1.5	98.5
2014	85.3	10,979	**66.1**	20.7	11.5	1.7	98.3

== Language ==
The traditional Swedish vernacular in Kalix is the Nederkalix dialect. It is not mutually intelligible with Standard Swedish, by which it has been largely replaced as the main language of the municipality. Finnish and Meänkieli are recognized minority languages in Kalix.

== Sport ==
Kalix BF plays in the top tier of Swedish bandy, Elitserien. The municipality has two other bandy clubs, Karlsborgs BK and Nyborgs SK.

== Sister city ==
Kalix Municipality has one sister city:

- Pielavesi, Finland

== Notable natives ==
- Peter Eriksson, politician

== See also ==
- List of islands of the Kalix archipelago
- Marahamnen
