= Nederkalix dialect =

Norrland dialect of Swedish

- kölismåle
- Pronunciation: [kœɽɪsˈmɔːɽɛ]
- Native to: Sweden
- Region: Kalix Municipality
- Language family: Indo-European: Germanic; North Germanic; Swedish; Norrland dialects; Kalix dialects; Nederkalix dialect

Language codes
- ISO 639-3: –
- Glottolog: None
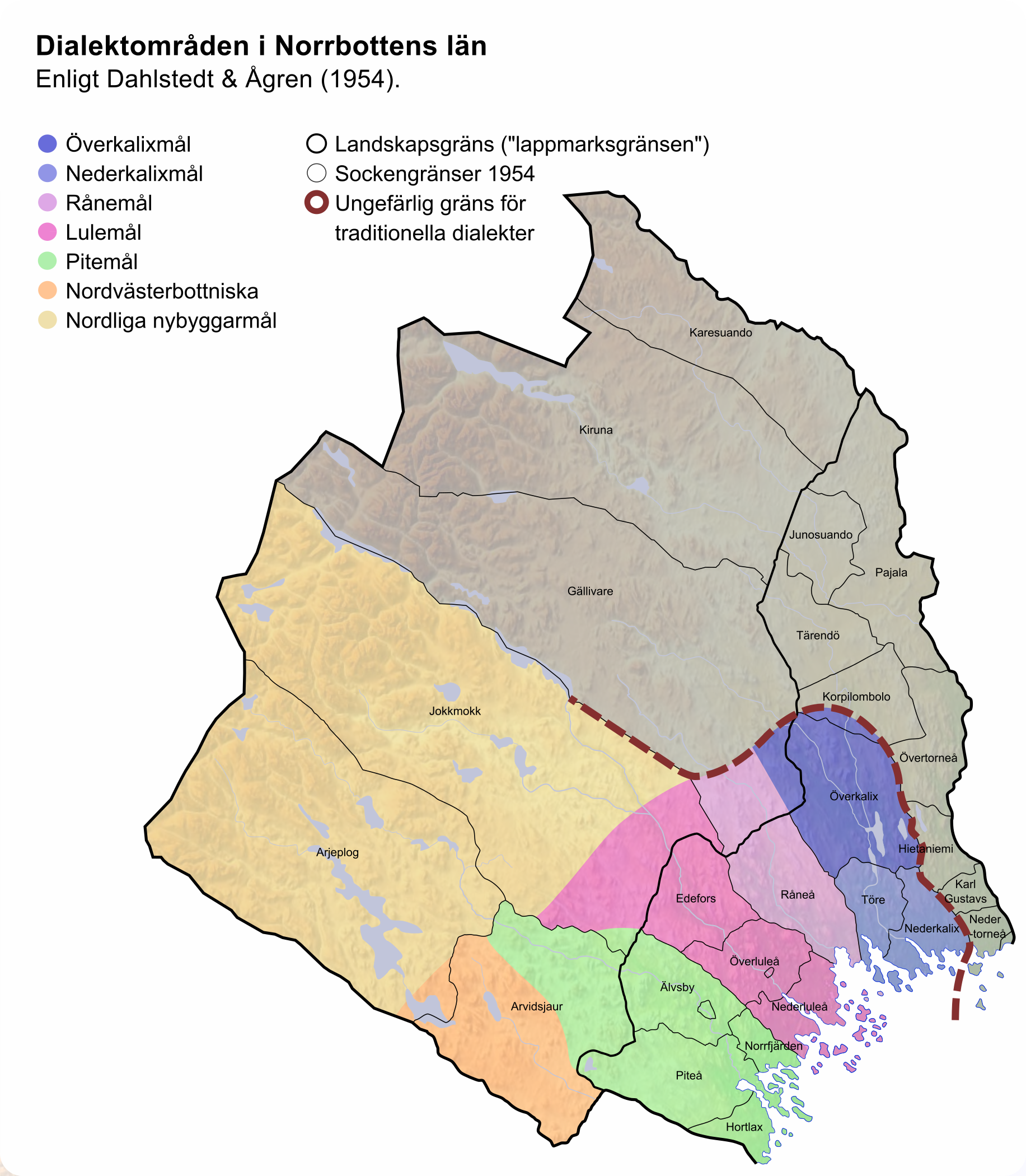
- Dialect areas in Norrbotten County with the Kalix dialect in light blue

Nederkalix dialect (sometimes plainly Kalix dialect; endonym: kölismåle [kœɽɪsˈmɔːɽɛ]) is a traditional Norrland dialect of Swedish, spoken in the historical parishes (Swedish: socknar) of Nederkalix and Töre in modern-day Kalix Municipality in Norrbotten in Sweden. The traditional Nederkalix dialect, like the other Norrland dialects, is very divergent from Standard Swedish, containing both archaisms and innovations in the phonological and grammatical systems.

The Nederkalix dialect retains Old Norse diphthongs, Old Swedish light syllables, and many initial consonants lost in Standard Swedish. In terms of morphology, the dialect has also preserved plural agreement of verbs, as well as the dative case, which have been lost in Standard Swedish.

The Nederkalix dialect has innovated many diphthongs from older long vowels. It also displays features such as vowel balance, apocope (with preserved double-peak pitch accent), and vowel harmony, all common in many Norrland dialects. Nasal consonants have been lost before a following plosive, with subsequent vowel nasalization. Like many other Norrland dialects, it has also innovated an extended use of the definite form and a preproprial article before proper names.

The Nederkalix dialect is most closely related to other traditional dialects in Norrbotten, especially the neighboring Överkalix dialect in the north. The three parishes constituted one single Kalix parish until the mid 17th century, when Överkalix parish split from Nederkalix, and the two dialects diverged. The Nederkalix and Överkalix dialects are however often considered to be mutually unintelligible.

== Documentation ==
The oldest preserved manuscripts in the Kalix dialect is an 1879 description of the area, a text which is used as a standard of genuinity. The Kalix dialect was first described by a thesis work by Hulda Rutberg, starting the year 1908 and presented at Uppsala University in 1924. The book contains many words and an extensive description of phonology and grammar. The language is also covered in later documentation, and by many recordings from the 1960s. The work of communities such as Föreningen Kalix Bygdemål, founded 1992, has kept collecting words and expressions to an extensive word lexicon, and is still active today.

== Phonology ==
The Kalix dialect has, according to Rutberg, 18 vowel monophthongs, 10 vowel diphthongs, and 29 consonants.

IPA	Ex.IPA	Ex.Latin	Translation
i	iːln	i:ln	the fire
ɪ	hɪn	hin	here
y	snyːn	sny:n	the snow
ʏ	ʏvɪ	yvi	over
e	ve:r	ve:r	weather
ɛ	mɛstɛ	meste	almost
æ	ʝæɾ	jär	is (singular)
ø	røː	rö:	red (singular)
œ	nœ	nö	now
ʉ	hʉl	hul	was going to
ʊ	ʝʊ	jo	yes/well
a	anar	anar	another
ɑ	lɑːk	la:k	long
ɒ	kɒm	kom	came
ɔ	gɔːɳ	gå:rn	the yard

== Grammar ==
=== Noun gender ===
Three grammatical genders exist:

- Feminine: e.g. "ha:ta" (the hand), "nagla" (the nail), "å:dra" (the vein), "sköuldra" (the shoulder), "påp:a" (the father), "måm:a" (the mother), "kjat:a" (the cat). But also "kuno" (the woman), "stuo" (the cottage), "sögo" (the saga).
- Masculine: e.g. "ståoLn" (the stool), "fåotn" (the foot), "armen" (the arm), "armboan" (the elbow), "tåomen" (the thumb), "måon" (the mouth).
- Neuter: "öe"/"öge" (the eye), "öre" (the ear), "höure" (the head), "bene" (the leg), "feingre" (the finger), "kni:e" (the knee), "bån:e" (the child).

Basically, words that in their definite form end with an "n" are masculine, an "e" is neuter, and all vowel except "e" are feminine.

General ending for words following the nouns are in feminine "-ar", masculine "-en", neuter "-e" or "-t", and plural "-er". Ex.

- Feminine: "he jär menar stuo" (it is my cottage) "hö ha:ar eingar på:åp" (she had no dad), "hukar kuno?" (which woman?), "woLar viko" (every week)
- Masculine: "men ståoL" (my stool), "anworn da" (every second day), "in tuken fåot" (such a foot)
- Neuter: "i lätet bån" (a little child), "tuke schwammeL" (such bullshit), "i anne å:r" (another year)
- Plural: "tuker stäinto" (such girls), "huker då:a?" (which days?), "einger feingro" (no fingers)

=== Definite and indefinite nouns ===
The definite noun form is used in a broader sense than in other Scandinavian languages, widespread in all dialects spoken in northern Scandinavia. Some examples: "je skå nå:åp i gröut ve bera" – I'll pick some (the)berries, "kunin jåra ät som kåran" – (the) women are not like (the) men. Definiteviness can be divided into four categories depending on the noun's plural form. Examples of usage with the feminine word "i fLa:ask" (a bottle / a flask):

- Enumerating indefinite, equal to singular or differs on accent only: "je ha:ar to fLa:ask" (I had two flasks), "i döusin fLa:ask" (a dozen flasks), "je ha fLe:r fLa:ask än di:" (I have more flasks than you), "ma:ak fLa:ask" (many flasks).
- Non-enumerating indefinite, "-o" ending: "he jär naer/einger/in del fLasko ini tjälaro" (there are some/no/some flasks in the cellar), "aar fLasko" (other flasks), "tuker fLasko" (such flasks), "he jär la:ka fLasko ini tjälaro" (there are long flasks in the cellar).
- Definite usage, "-en" ending: "he jär mytji fLasken ini tjälaro" (there are a lot of flasks in the cellar), "å:åll fLasken jåra bå:årt" (all flasks are gone), "höundratale å fLasken" (hundreds of flasks), "he var fLasken ållostans" (there were flasks everywhere), "whiskeyfLasken" (wiskey flasks), "we hå:å la:kfLasken å röundfLasken" (we have long flasks and round flasks), "di ha:ar snört fLasken ållostans" (they had thrown flasks everywhere).
- Definite "-en": "ta ve de fLasken då do gja öut" (take the flasks with you when you go out)

For masculine nouns, the four forms are e.g. "in bi:l" (a car) "to bi:il" (two cars) "naer bi:lo" (some cars), "mytji bi:lan" (many cars), and "bi:lan" (the cars). Neuter definitive plural ending is "-a". Non-enumerative words e.g. "i höus" (a house), "i gåLv" (a floor) are exceptions lacking the "-o" form.

=== Case ===
Dative is separated from the accusative and nominative case, e.g. feminine: "Din jär SkåoLa, je siti ini skå:oLn" (there is the school, I am sitting in the school), masculine: "je sei tjälarn, he lik na ini tjälaro" (I see the basement, it's something in the basement).

Several forms of genitive cases exists, e.g. "Je ha ons Enok bi:l" (I have Enok's car), "je fick bre:ve än Anna" (I got Anna's letter), "kLåk:a gran:o" (The neighbor's clock).

=== Verbs ===
Verbs are conjugated in singular and plural, unlike modern standard Swedish: "hån jär" (he is) but "di jåra" (they are), "hö löut se" (she leans herself) but "di lö:ut se" (they lean themselves), "je far" (I go) but "we fåra" (we go), "je vil" (I want) but "di vili" (they want). But there are irregular verbs which does not differ, e.g. "je liot fåra" (I have to go) / "we liot fåra" (we have to go).

=== Adjectives ===
Most adjectives are equal in singular and plural, similar to English but distinct from many other Scandinavian languages, e.g.: "dö:rn jär ipi" (the door is open) and "doran jåra ipi" (the doors are open), "bå:ne jär vötchin" (the child is awake) and "bå:na jåra vötchin" (the children are awake), "do jär wälkymin heit" (she is welcome here) and "di jåra wälkymin heit" (they are welcome here).

Other adjectives differs in singular and plural, and have two plural forms, e.g. "flaska jär rö:" (the flask is red), "rö:a flasko, so jåra rö:ö" (red flasks, that are red).

Adjectives can also be joined with nouns, e.g. "råLkafötren" (dirty feet), or serially joined, e.g. "lilvåckerstäinta" (the little beautiful girl).

=== Preproprial article ===
A preproprial article is widespread traditional Norrland dialects and is also found in many parts of Norway. It functions as an obligatory article before proper names and kinship terms. In the Nederkalix dialect, it takes the form on or en in the masculine, and na or a in the feminine. There are also separate dative forms of the article: nu or u in the masculine, and en in the feminine, but the basic (nominative) forms are also used in the dative.

== Writing systems ==
The Nederkalix dialect, like the absolute majority of Swedish dialects, lack a standard orthography. In early dialectological descriptions, the phonetic Swedish Dialect Alphabet was used to transcribe the dialect. In more non-scientific contexts, the Swedish alphabet has been used, including the letters ⟨å ä ö⟩ and certain ad-hoc representations of sounds not found in Standard Swedish, e.g. a capitalized or boldface ⟨l⟩ for the retroflex flap, a colon ⟨:⟩ for marking long vowels etc.
