= Gutasaga =

Saga regarding the history of Gotland in Sweden

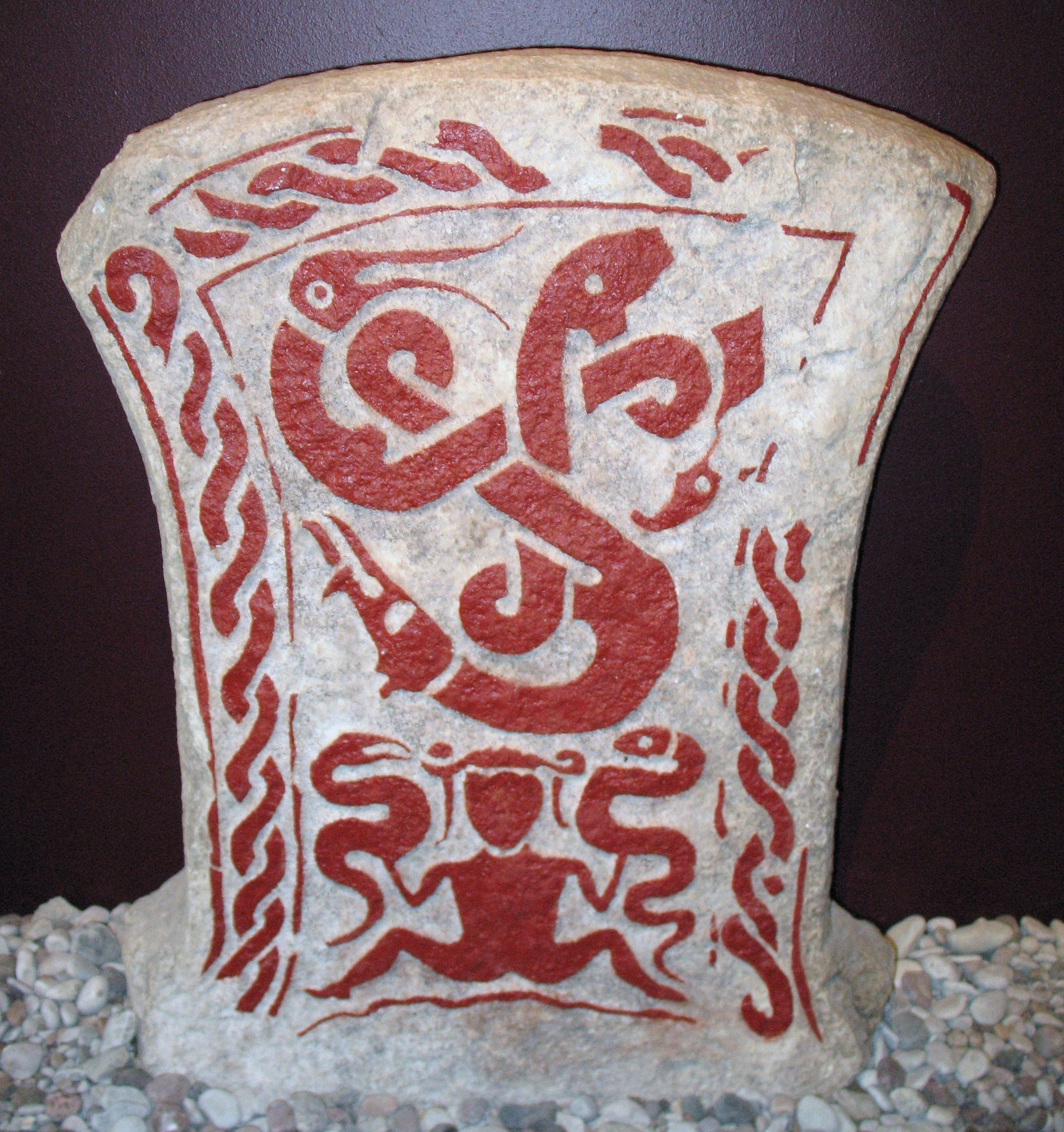
This picture stone from Smiss in När, Gotland has been interpreted as depicting Vitastjärna.

Gutasaga (Gutasagan) is a saga regarding the history of Gotland before its Christianization. It was recorded in the 13th century and survives in only a single manuscript, the Codex Holm. B 64, dating to c. 1350, kept at the National Library of Sweden in Stockholm together with the Gutalag, the legal code of Gotland. It was written in the Old Gutnish language, a variety of Old Norse.

== Contents ==
=== A local creation myth ===
The saga begins with Gotland being discovered by a man named Þieluar (Swedish: Tjälvar, Gutnish: Tjelvar). Gotland is under a spell and under water during the day and out of water only during the night, a spell that is broken by Þieluar lighting a fire on the island. Þieluar had a son named Hafþi (Swedish: Hafþi), who married a woman named Hwitastierna (Swedish: Vitastjärna; English: White-star). After Hafþi's and Hwitastierna's first night together, she has a dream about three snakes entwined in her bosom. Hafþi interprets her dream as a prophecy of her being pregnant with three sons. He gives them names while still in her womb. Here the saga cites an old alliterative verse, probably deriving from oral tradition:

Alt ir baugum bundit
boland al þitta warþa
oc faum þria syni aiga.
Guti al Gutland aigha
Graipr al annar haita
oc Gunfiaun þriþi.

“Everything is bound by armlets; this land will become settled, and we will come to own three sons.
Guti will own Gotland; Graipr will the other be called, and Gunfiaun [will be] the third.”

These three brothers go on to father the Gutes. According to the prose they then divided Gotland, so that Graipr, the oldest (and here the prose disagrees with the verse, according to which Gute was the oldest) held the northern third (Old Gutnish: þriþiungr, Swedish: treding), Gute the middle third, and Gunnfjaun the southern third. This division of Gotland into three parts remained legally until 1747 and still remains within the church, which still today retains this division into three Deaneries.

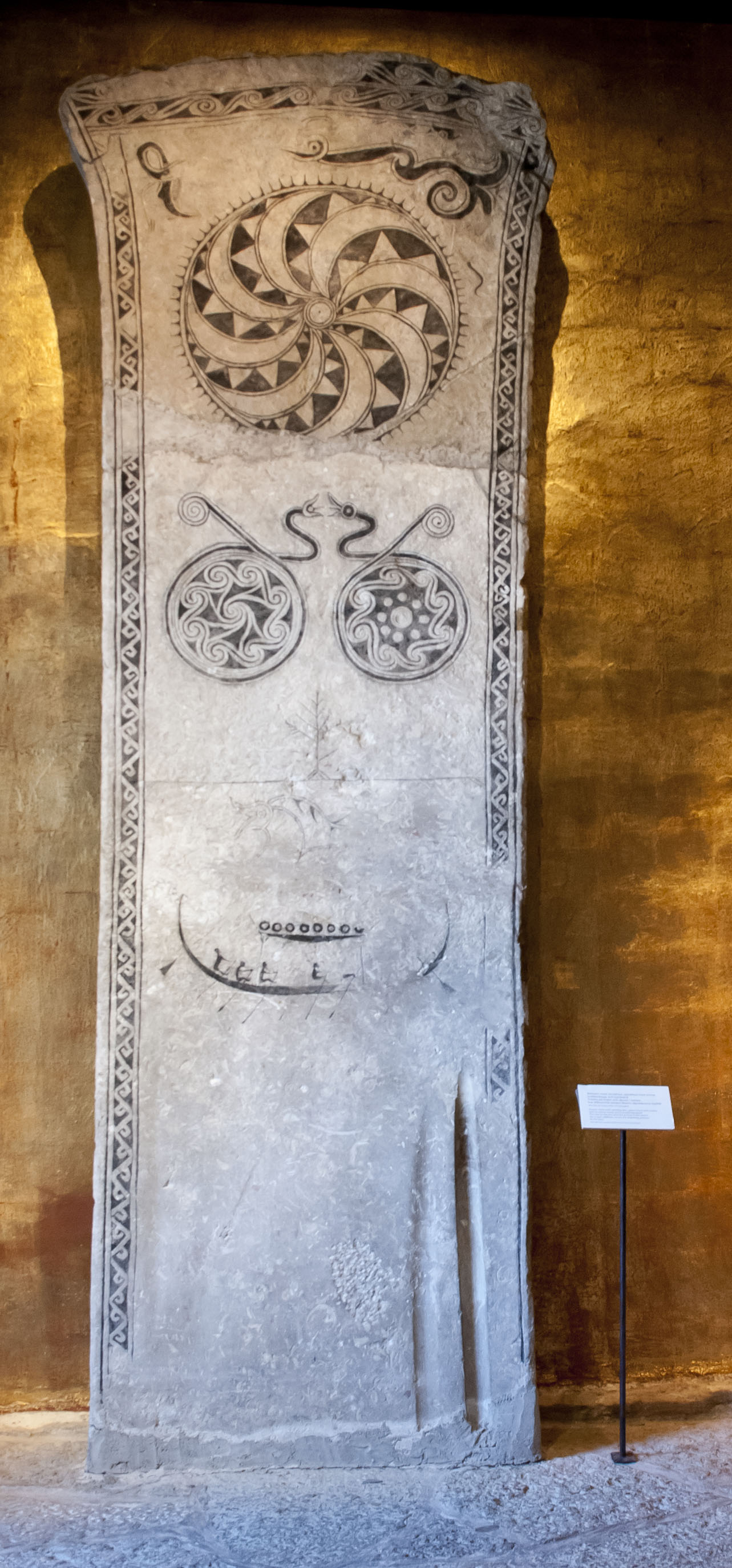
"Everything is bound by armlets" from Gutasaga

=== Emigration to southern Europe ===
The saga tells of an emigration that is associated with the historical migration of the Goths during the Migration Period:

Thereafter the people descended from these three multiplied so much over a long time that the land could not support them all. Then they drew lots, and every third person was sent away in such a way that they could keep all that they owned and take it with them, except for their land. Thereafter they would leave the land by force, and journeyed to Þorsburg and dwelled there. Thereafter that land would not tolerate them, but chased them away thence. Thereafter they journeyed away to Faroy, and settled there. There they could not remain, but journeyed to an island close to Estonia, which is called Dagaiþi, and settled there and made a fortress which is still seen. But not even there could they remain, but journeyed forth along the water which is called the Dyna, and up-river through Russia. So far went they that they came to Greece.

That the Goths should have gone Greece is consistent with their first appearance in classical sources: Eusebius of Caesarea reported that they devastated "Macedonia, Greece, the Pontus, and Asia" in 263.

Historically the emigration would have taken place in the 1st century AD, with loose contact with the homeland being maintained for some centuries afterwards. According to the writer the emigrants "settled there, and still dwell [there], and still have something of our language." (bygþus þair þar firir, ok enn byggia, ok enn hafa þair sumt af waru mali).

The mention of the Dvina river is in good agreement with the Wielbark culture. Historically, the Goths followed the Vistula, but during the Viking Age, the Dvina-Dniepr waterway succeeded the Vistula as the main trade route to Greece for the Gutes (or Gotar in standard Old Norse), and it is not surprising that it also replaced the Vistula in the migration traditions.

=== Entry into the Kingdom of Sweden ===
The Gutasaga contains several references to the relationship between Gotland and Sweden. It asserts that it was based on mutual agreements, and notes the duties and obligations of the Swedish king and bishop in relationship to Gotland. It is therefore not only an effort to write down the history of Gotland, but also an effort to assert Gotland's independence from Sweden.

The man who arranged the mutually beneficial agreement with the king of Sweden is named as Awair Strabain. That event should have taken place before the end of the 9th century, when Wulfstan of Hedeby reported that the island was subject to the Swedes.

== Modern Gotland ==
Tjelvar and several other names of people from the Gutasaga are used for places, establishments and other Gotland related things like websites. A stone ship in Boge is called Tjelvar's Grave. Boge is also the place for the bay Tjäldersvik and the Tjäldersholm island. The Digerrojr cairn in Garde is also known as Graips rojr.

In 2011, a competition, hosted by the Swedish Astronomical Society, for naming a newly discovered Apollo asteroid was held in Visby. It was named 137052 Tjelvar after Tjelvar, the mythological first man to bring fire to the island.

== See also ==
- Norse saga
- Geats
- Goths
- Gotlander
