= Fårömål dialect =

Dialect of Gutnish

Fårömål
- Fårö Gutnish
- Native to: Sweden
- Region: Fårö
- Language family: Indo-European: Germanic; North Germanic; Gutnish; Fårömål
- Early forms: Old Norse: Old Gutnish

Language codes
- ISO 639-3: –
- Glottolog: faro1245

Fårömål (Fårö Gutnish) is the dialect of Gutnish spoken on the Baltic island of Fårö north of Gotland. The name "Fårö" (in Gutnish, Fåre) is derived from the words ö, meaning island, and probably far-, which is a word stem associated with travel, as in the Swedish verb fara (to travel). The name Fårö probably means 'the island you have to travel to' or 'the traveler's island'. Mainland Swedes might misinterpret the name Fårö to be derived from får, the Standard Swedish word for 'sheep', due to the many sheep on the island. That word is absent from Modern Gutnish, which uses the word lamm (which in Swedish means 'lamb') instead. Gotlanders describe Fårömål as sounding "coarse" and as characterized by "mumbling".

Fårömål is the most archaic dialect of Gutnish in terms of morphology and phonetics. The dialect is closest to Old Gutnish and has retained, for example, the a-ending of the infinitive. There are also verb endings that no longer exist in the dialect of the main island (Storlandsmål) as in Swedish and Danish (e. g.: ja kimbur, däu kumbort, han kumbur). And while the unstressed endings are often dropped in the Main Island dialect, the Fårö Gutnish has preserved them (e. g. Han skudd' gleid' (gläid') ti Fol u kaup' skog on the main island → Han skudde gläida till Fola u kaupa skog in Farømål).

In Fårömålet there are sentence constructions, where Swedish or Danish would normally insert a det (e.g. da bleir an mild vintor instead of då blir det en mild vinter in Swedish or der bliver det en mild vinter in Danish). The dialect also shares similarities with Danish (e.g. inte rätt/rett stor instead of inte särskilt stor). At the same time its intonation is a little closer to Swedish.

Dialectal Differences and Similarities
Fårö Gutnish	Mainland Gutnish	Swedish	Elfdalian	Danish	Bornholmsk	English
Bondi	Bonde	Bonde	Bonde	Bonde	Bonde	Farmer
Fastlande (Note: Fastlande has the literal meaning of 'mainland'.)	Gåttland or Gutland	Gotland	Gotland	Gotland	Gulland	Gotland
Svensk Fastlande	Fastlande	Sverige	Sverige	Sverige	Sverrig	Sweden
Hertingg	Hertingg	Hertig	Hertug	Hertug	Hertug	Duke
åvla	åvle	odla	ala	avle	avla	(to) farm

== Bibliography ==
- Gunilla Brogren: Um Fåre u Fåreboar pa fåröiskå, Fårö hembygdsförening (Udg.) 2013 ISBN 9789198054712
- Herbert Gustavson: Gutamålet – inledning till studium. 3. oplag. Barry Press Förlag, Visby 1977.
- Adolf Noreen: Fårömålets ljudlära, Stockholm 1875
