= Awair Strabain =

Awair Strabain or Avar Stråben ("straw-legs") was according to the Gutasaga a chieftain from Alva socken on Gotland and a wise and able man.

The Gutasaga relates how many kinds attacked the island of Gotland in heathen times, but the gutes had always emerged victorious. Apparently the gutes were in conflict with the Swedes since several emissaries were sent to them to negotiate peace, but with no success. Finally Awair was sent as negotiator to the king of the Swedes. He reached an agreement that stipulated that Gotland would pay a certain tax to the land of the Swedes; "so that the Gutes would go of their own free will under the king of the Swedes so that they would freely and without risk travel to all places in the lands of the Swedes without paying tolls or other fees."

According to a legend Awair Strabain came to the king of the Swedes and was granted an audience during a meal. The king asked "what news on the island of the Gutes?" to which Awair answered "Not much. But recently a mare bore three foals." "What does the third foal do, when the other two are feeding?" wondered the king. "I suppose he does like me, stands and watches," was his answer. Awair's answer was considered so clever and bold that Awair was permitted to sit down and eat with the king. After negotiations were more easily conducted.

The time of the agreement is disputed since the Gutasaga doesn't mention a date. However, Wulfstan relates that Gotland was part of the realm of the Swedes already in the 880's, so it should likely have taken place before then.

The archaeologists Birger Nerman, Gad Rausing och Bo Gräslund date Awair to the middle of the 6'th century. The latter two speculate on whether the story of Awair can be connected to events related in the Old English epic poem of Beowulf, and that he possibly be a historical precursor to Beowulf himself.

== Sources ==
- Thunmark-Nylén, Lena (1995). Vikingatidens ABC. Statens historika museum.
- PressReader.com - Digital Newspaper & Magazine Subscriptions
- Gotland the Pearl of the Baltic Sea, home of the Varangians pages 1-166, pp 104-108
- Origin Svear
