= Gutalagen =

Medieval laws of Gotland

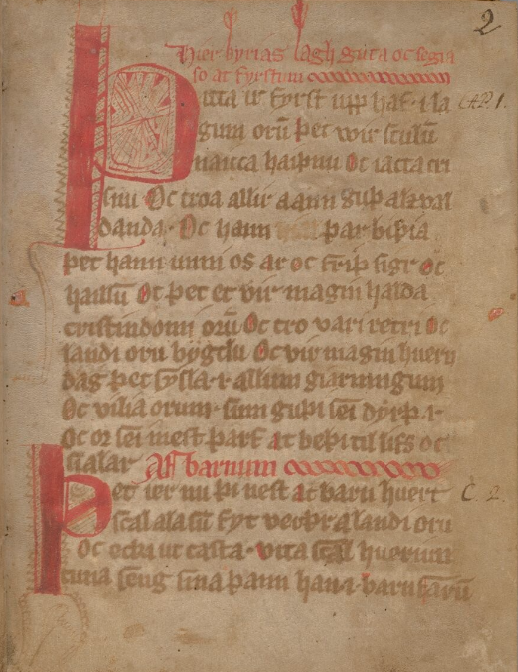
The beginning of ‘‘Gutalagen’’ in the Holm B 64 manuscript.

Gutalagen (or Guta lag; "The law of the Gotlanders") is the earliest preserved law book for Gotland. The laws were likely first written down around 1220 CE but there is evidence for the laws being older than this, with some aspects likely being pre-Christian. They were practically in use until 1645 despite control of Gotland changing hands several times throughout this period between Sweden, Denmark and the Teutonic Order.

The laws cover a broad range of topics, including banning Old Nordic religion and enforcing adherence to Christianity, along with describing fines for different levels of assault and conditions by which domesticated animals can be returned to their sellers. It typically assigns fines as punishments, with amounts varying depending on the wealth and slave-status of those involved.

Guta saga is included as an appendix to the laws in manuscripts such as the Old Gutnish Holm B 64. As the extant body of Old Gutnish is limited, Gutalagen forms a significant part of it, making it of high linguistic importance.

== Law in Gotland ==
It is unclear when Gotland first became under Swedish control, as while Wulfstan describes this as being the case in the 9th century, it has been argued that it was still independent in the 10th century. By the 12th century, the island was at least partly dominated by Sweden. At the time of Gutalagen's compilation, Gotland was mostly independent from Sweden and had its own administrative and legal system. Gotland retained a regional law code separate from that of Sweden until 1645, when it came under direct Swedish rule. And exception to the wider Gotland law was the Visby stadslag "Visby's town law" which was established in Visby, which had a significant German population, after a civil war in 1288.

Control of Gotland shifted throughout the 14th-16th centuries, with it variously falling under the control of Denmark, the Teutonic Order and Sweden. After Valdemar IV's invasion in 1361, Denmark was substituted for Sweden in legal terms and Gotland's traditional independence was maintained. Magnus Eriksson created a national law for Sweden (Magnus Erikssons landslag) in the mid-14th century to replace provincial laws, however its implementation across Sweden was gradual. ‘‘Gutalagen’’ remained effectively in force until 1645 when Sweden took control of Gotland from Denmark despite attempts by Christian IV of Denmark to apply the Skåne law in Gotland beginning in 1595.

== Origin and role ==
The earliest preserved provincial laws of the kingdom of Sweden date to after its Christianisation, however parts likely had origins while the traditional religion was still dominant. It has been suggested that the first ‘‘Gutalagen’’ manuscript was written at the instigation of Archbishop Andreas Suneson of Lund, based on his visit to the island in 1207. It was likely written down in Gotland, given that versions exist written in Gutnish. It further opens with "in our law" (i lagum orum), suggesting the writer was a Gotlander.

It has been argued that the text is partly theoretical and represents an ideal rather than a practical framework. This is supported by large weregilds demanded, which could not have been afforded by those that weren't wealthy landowners. It has further been debated whether ‘‘Gutalagen’’ is either a rättsbok ("justice book"), a record of the laws in force at a particular time to help law speakers remember the laws, or a lagbok ("statute book"), a collection of systematic, normalised law codes that were directly incorporated into the legal process.

== Manuscripts ==
The ‘‘Gutalagen’’ was likely written down as a single original manuscript around 1220 CE and has been preserved in eight manuscripts. Two of the medieval manuscripts are written in Old Gutnish, one made of vellum kept in Kungliga biblioteket (Holm B 64) and one of paper in the Arnamagnæan Manuscript Collection (AM 54, 4^{to}). Holm B 64 also contains Guta saga in Old Gutnish. There is also a vellum manuscript written in a mixture of Middle High German and Middle Low German, two Danish paper versions, a manuscript with later Danish provisions and two 18th century paper manuscripts in Gutnish. Four more manuscripts survive which only include the law's historical appendix Guta saga. Holm B 64 is notable, being the oldest surviving manuscript written in Old Gutnish and as it shows less external linguistic influence than AM 54, 4^{to}. Beyond these two manuscripts, Old Gutnish is attested only in some runic inscriptions and runic calendars. ‘‘Gutalagen’’ therefore is an important linguistic source.

== Contents ==
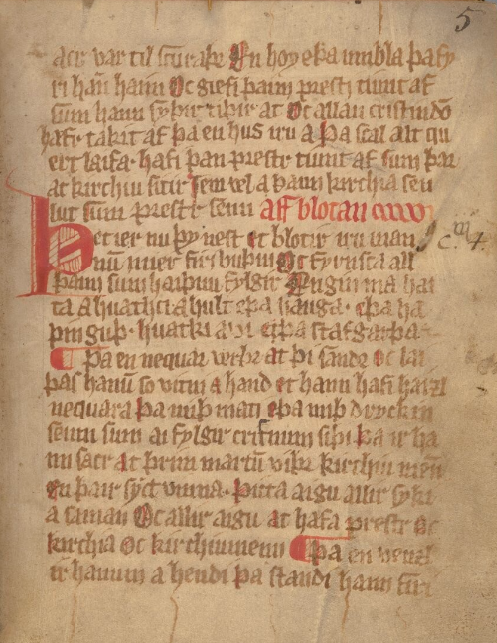
The "af blotan" section of ‘‘Gutalagen’’ in the Holm B 64 manuscript.

The versions that survive show evidence of revisions. The text further is organised chapters, however these do not cover the whole legal process. Furthermore, unlike the mainland provincial Swedish laws, ‘‘Gutalagen’’ has no reference to the king, including no no pledge of kingly involvement in local law. It also doesn't reference Sweden at all, although it has been argued that inhabitants of Gotland that weren't Gotlanders (ogutniskt fulk) were likely Swedish There is also no mention of trade or maritime law

The laws begin by stating that the community should reject heathendom, accept Christianity and believe in one almighty God. This section closely resembles that in the Norwegian older law of Gulaþing, with both saying that we should pray for good harvest and peace (ar oc friþ in Gutalagen). The law requires adherence to Christianity, such as in the paying of tithes and attendance at church on Sundays. It also makes the Old Nordic religion illegal, including forbidding practices such as the performing of blót, and praying to, or at, groves, howes, heathen gods, vé and stafgarþar. The meaning of stafgarþar is debated, with translations including "fenced-off areas" and the literal "staved-yard". The term likely refers to either religious spaces enclosed by palisades or featuring one of more staves. These may have been arranged so as to direct attention towards the middle of the structure. This has been compared to the Old English frið-geardas, fenced off areas containing a stone, tree or spring which were made illegal in Norðhymbra preosta lagu. Furthermore, archaeological evidence for areas marked off by stones or fences exists in Scandinavia dating throughout the Stone, Bronze and Iron Ages and has been proposed to have formed a holy space. Possible stafgarþar have been identified in Gotland that cluster in the middle of the island, particularly where roads meet or at þing sites.

Other subjects covered by the law include acts such as manslaughter, assault and adultery. It also covers disputes over woodlands, responsibilities for wells and the conditions by which one may return domestic animals that have been bought. It further prescribes fines regarding family matters such as weddings, funerals and inheritance.

Guta saga is found at the end of some ‘‘Gutalagen’’ manuscripts, including Holm B 64. It is not clear when they were first arranged this way. Some topics are covered by both texts, such as arrangements relating to visitations of bishops to Gotland. Furthermore, Guta saga paraphrases ‘‘Gutalagen’’, describing how the heathen Gotlanders used to follow the same customs that the law code lists as punishable offences.

== Punishments ==
Fines for committing crimes is complex and may be contradictory in some sections. Unlike in the other Swedish provincial law codes, there is little detail for non-fine punishments. These included excommunication, outlawry, slavery, branding and hanging, and were given in cases such as theft, adultery and misuse of property. Theft and adultery are punished more strongly than killing, likely because they break down trust in the community. Excommunication could be imposed for damaging monastic property and for violence during church festivals before the fine has been paid. Outlawry was given if fines for killing were not paid in time. Gotlander status could also be taken away, such as if one illegally sold their land, while if one misappropriated land worth three marks in rent, a man would be killed and his wife would lose her pew in church. Property and animals could also be confiscated for crimes such as working in someone else's woodland.

The laws specify that if one is obliged to pay a fine for someone else, they do not have to pay more than they can afford. Furthermore, one was only responsible for their own share of the inherited fee. When slaves committed crimes, as they could not pay the fine, the owner was first expected to cover the cost. If this was not possible, the slave's length of bondage could be extended or they could be killed. The slave could also be offered as wergild for a killing. If a slave raped a Gotland woman, she could choose either to receive compensation, or for the slave to be killed. What would now be seen as sexual harassment against women is punished, although the women were held partly responsible for protecting themselves, resulting in punishments that lessen as the severity increases. This is distinguished from male sexual assaults on women, where the men are punished according to the degree of severity. There are no similar provisions in the Swedish provincial laws.

== See also ==
- Anglo-Saxon law
- Medieval Scandinavian laws

== Bibliography ==
=== Primary ===
- "AM 54 4to Handrit.is". handrit.is (in Icelandic).
- Guta lag: the law of the Gotlanders (PDF). Translated by Peel, Christine. London: Viking Society for Northern Research, Univ. College London. 2009. ISBN 978-0-903521-79-6.
- "Gutaloven – heimskringla.no". heimskringla.no.

=== Secondary ===
- Gunnell, Terry Adrian (2005). "Hof, Halls, Goðar and Dwarves: An Examination of the Ritual Space in the Pagan Icelandic Hall". Cosmos 17: 3–36.
- Gunnell, Terry (2017). "Blótgyðjur, Goðar, Mimi, Incest, and Wagons: Oral Memories of the Vanir". Old Norse Mythology—Comparative Perspectives. Ed. Pernille Hermann, Stephen A. Mitchell, and Jens Peter Schjødt, with Amber J. Rose.
- Meaney, Audrey L. (January 2004). "'And we forbeodað eornostlice ælcne hæðenscipe': Wulfstan and Late Anglo-Saxon and Norse 'Heathenism'". Wulfstan, Archbishop of York. Studies in the Early Middle Ages. 10. Brepols Publishers: 461–500. doi:10.1484/m.sem-eb.3.3720. ISBN 978-2-503-52224-1.
- Sayers, William (16 December 2022). "The Guta Lag's injunctions against pagan worship: The term stafgarþr from the perspectives of taxonomy, legalese, and poetic diction". Namn och Bygd. 110: 77–86. doi:10.69489/nob.v110i.23485. ISSN 2002-4177.
- Vrieland, Sean D (2011). "Old Gutnish historical phonology and the Old Norse context" (PDF). Universiteit Leiden.
