= Til árs ok friðar =

Old Norse ritual formula

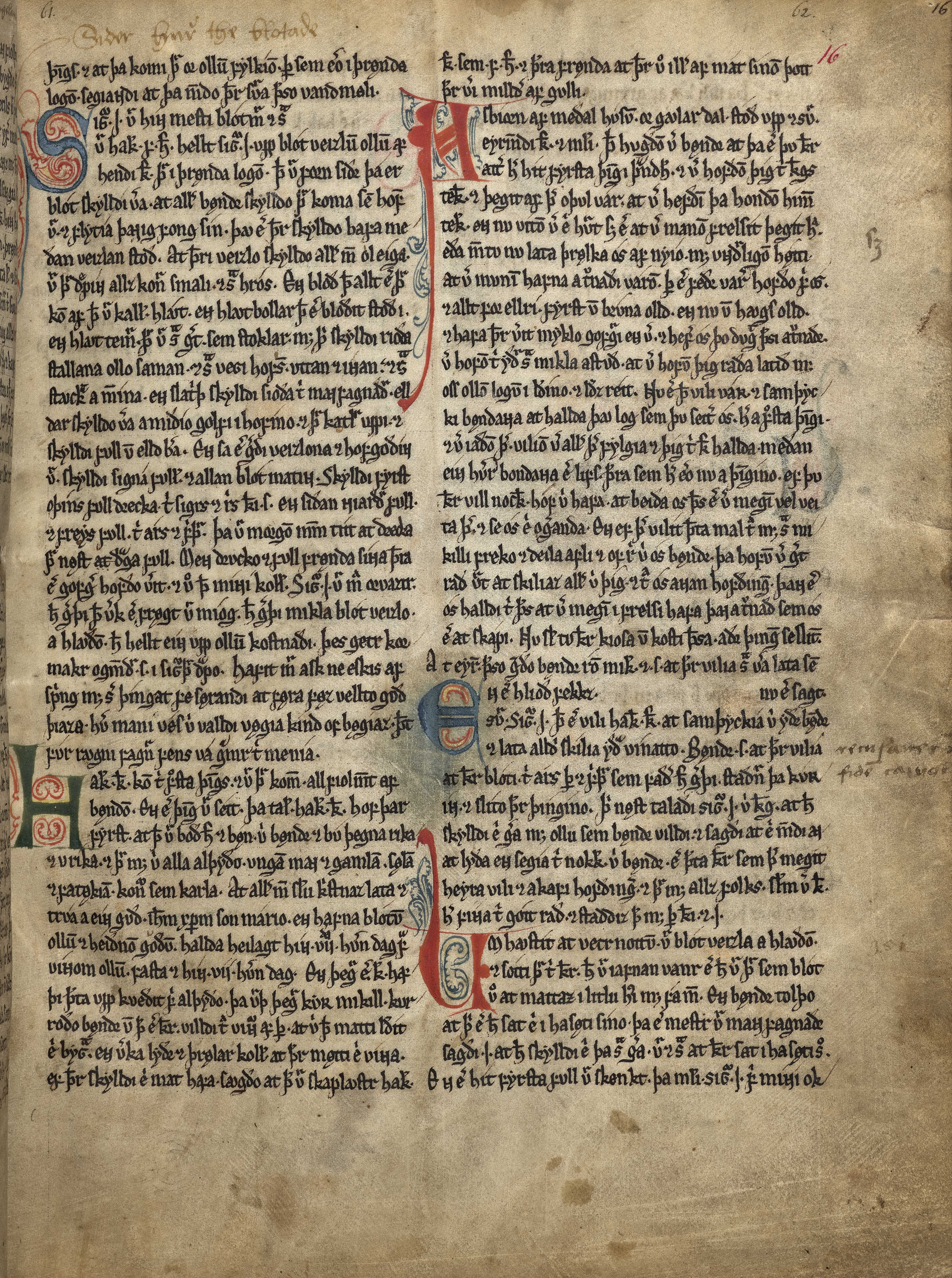
Hákonar saga góða's account in Fríssbók of toasts being made til árs ok friðar.

Til árs ok friðar ("For a good year and peace") is an Old Norse ritual formula recorded in association with Old Nordic religious practices such as drinking at blót-feasts and in the making of offerings at howes, in particular in association with Freyr. While the phrase's origins are debated by scholars, it was likely adopted by the Church during the Christianisation of Scandinavia, leading to its inclusion in the Medieval Scandinavian law codes Gutalagen from Gotland and Den ældre Gulathings-Lov from Norway. Its usage its very similar in both heathen and Christian contexts, in which figures relevant to each religion are appealed to in order to bring a good year and peace, typically by a societal elite.

== Meaning and etymology ==
Til árs ok friðar and its related forms have been variously translated as "for good harvest and peace", "for prosperity and peace", "for good crops and peace" and "for a good year and peace".

The phrase contains the words ár ("year", "plenty", "fruitfulness") and friðr ("frith", "peace", "personal security"). Ár is derived from Proto-Germanic: *jéra-. It is the ancestor of Danish and Swedish: år and is cognate with Modern English year, Dutch: jaar, North Frisian: jûar, and German: Jahr, all of which share the meaning "year". Friðr ("peace", "friendship", "security") is derived from Proto-Germanic: *friþu- ("peace", "friendship") and is ancestral to Danish and Swedish: fred. It is further cognate with Old English: friðu and its Modern English descendent frith ("peace", "safety", "security"), along with Gothic: friþu-s (found in the name Friþareiks), and Dutch: vrede ("peace").

== Origin and similarities with other expressions ==
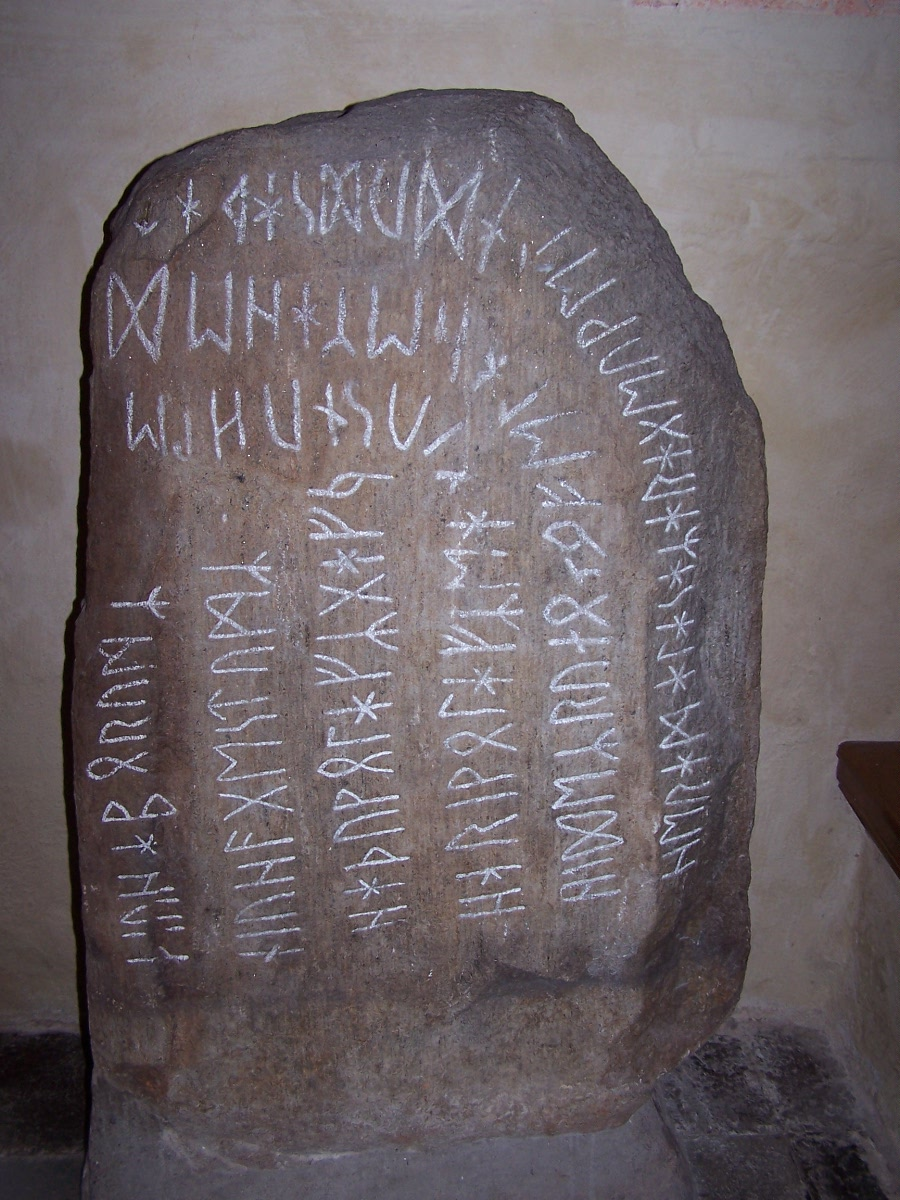
The Stentoften stone, believed to use an equivalent to ár to refer to good crops brought through sacrifice.

Til árs ok friðar has been argued to be originally a Christian phrase, including by Klaus Düwel, who suggested it comes from missionary language. Anders Hultgård, however, concludes that there are no prototypes for this formula in medieval Christian literature and that the ideas are consistent with ideas in Scandinavian religion. They further suggest that the medieval Church adopted it from the traditional religion as a form of syncretism during the Christianisation of Scandinavia. This position has gained support from other scholars. Elias Wessén has suggested it to have been related to the cult of Freyr, while Hultgård notes the similarity between ár and an Iranian cultic formula, found for example in the Younger Avestan Yasht 8, and suggests Indo-European origins to the expression.

Similarities have also been drawn with the Stentoften stone, which has an inscription typically interpreted as using jāra as an ideographic rune to mean "good year crops", in an equivalent way as ár. This may therefore suggest both that rulers performed blót to ensure a good harvest, and that this terminology was used in pre-Christian religious contexts.

== In Old Nordic religion ==
Hákonar saga góða in Heimskringla describes a blót in Trøndelag where toasts were to be drunk, first to Óðinn for victory and power to the king, then to Njǫrðr and Freyr til árs ok friðar ("for good harvest and peace"). In addition to the formula appearing in the context of ritual drinking, it is also used later in the text, where King Hákon is expected by the farmers of Trøndelag at the Frostaþing to blót til árs ... ok friðar, as his father, Harald Fairhair had done.

The event is also described in Ágrip and Fagrskinna. In the latter, the farmers, this same event is told, with them saying that if he does not perform the blót and so on ratify the ancient laws til árs ok friðar, he will be thrown out of the land. The king was unwilling as he was Christian, but agreed to blót nonetheless.

The king is therefore proposed to have had power over good crops and peace for the people and was a necessary link to the gods during these feasts. Furthermore, that through these rituals, along with the king eating meat from the blót, the ancient law was ratified. The description given in Hákonar saga góða is consistent with other accounts of Nordic religious practice to improve harvests and through worshipping Freyr and Njǫrðr. These include Snorri Sturluson's description of Freyr in Gylfaginning, where he says that he is good to call upon til árs ok friðar, and the euhemeristic Ynglinga saga, where after Freyr's death, he is buried in a howe and offerings are made to him til árs ok friðar. A related phrase is used in Óláfs saga helga, which gives an account of the people from the Trondheim Fjord gathering at Mære during the reign of Saint Olaf at midwinter, where they held sacrifices til friðar ok vetrarfars góðs ("for peace and a good season").

Blót for árs only are also well attested, including the in Óláfs þáttr Geirstaðaálfs in Flateyjarbók, which similar to the account of Freyr, describes how after the death of the king Ólafr, offerings are made to him for ár and he is called Geirstaðaálfr ("the Álfr of Geirstaðir"). Ynglinga saga further describes how in Svetjud there were three yearly blót, including one at the beginning of winter to ensure a good season (ár) and another at midwinter for good crops (gróðrar). It further reports that the king Dómaldi was sacrificed by the Svear for better crops (blóta till árs).

== In medieval Christian Scandinavia ==
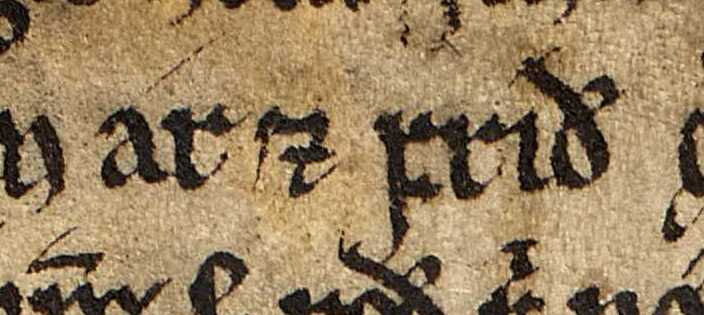
árs ok friðar in Glælognskviða, as shown in Eirspennill.

Possibly the earliest attestation of the formula in Old Norse is in Glælognskviða, composed in the early 11th century by the skald Þórarinn loftunga, which states:

Old Norse text

Bið Ǫ́leif,
at unni þér
— hanns goðs maðr —
grundar sinnar
— hann of getr
af goði sjalfum
ár ok frið
ǫllum mǫnnum —,
þás þú rekr
fyr reginnagla
bóka máls
boenir þínar.

Sundqvist translation

Pray to Óláfr that he grant you his ground [Norway], — he is God's man; he obtains from God himself prosperity and peace for all people — when you present your prayers before the sacred nail of the language of books [LATIN > SAINT = Óláfr].

Similarly, Sigvatr Þórðarson describes Óláfr in Knútsdrápa as jǫfurr ársæll ("the season-blessed prince"). The stanza containing this phrase is quoted in Ágrip, where it is further stated in contrast that when Ælfgifu of Northampton and her son with Cnut, Sveinn took control in Trondheim, there was famine and misery fyr því at aldregi var ár á þeira dǫgum ("because the seasons were never good in their time").

The formula is also found in medieval Scandinavian law codes such as Den ældre Gulathings-Lov from Norway, which begins by saying that that "we should bow to the east and pray to the holy Christ for ars ok friðar and that heathendom should be revoked. This very closely resembles Gutalagen from Gotland, which is potentially an independent tradition due to its geographical separation. This similarly says that heathen ways should be rejected, Christianity accepted, and that the almighty God should be prayed to for ar oc friþ. Den ældre Gulathings-Lov further imposes fines for those who when celebrating All Saints' Day and Christmas (Yule) that do not bless ale in order to thank "Christ and St. Mary. For prosperity and peace" (til árs. oc til friðar). Similarly, in Frostathings-Lov, fasts are dedicated til árs oc friðar oc til heillsu allum monnum ("for prosperity and peace and for good health to all men").

The role of the formula in Christian contexts has been argued to be slightly adjusted from in the explicitly heathen contexts, but to have retained its core function. Dedications are made to Christian figures, for example, such as Christ, Mary or St Ólafr, instead of gods like Freyr and Njọrðr. Rulers also continue to act as intermediaries between the godly sphere and farmers.

== See also ==
- Fertility rite - Related practices in other cultures to bring a good harvest
- Norse rituals - Other religious practices in Old Nordic religion

== Bibliography ==
=== Primary ===
- Guta lag: the law of the Gotlanders (PDF). Translated by Peel, Christine. London: Viking Society for Northern Research, Univ. College London. 2009. ISBN 978-0-903521-79-6.
- Simensen, Erik (6 April 2021). Simensen, Erik (ed.). The Older Gulathing Law. Routledge. pp. vi, 8–9, 11–12, 36–37. doi:10.4324/9781003134459. ISBN 978-1-003-13445-9.
- Sturluson, Snorri (2018). The Prose Edda. Translated by Brodeur, Arthur Gilchrist. Franklin Classics Trade Press. ISBN 9780344335013.
- "Gylfaginning (Old Norse)". heimskringla.no.

=== Secondary ===
- Gunnell, Terry (2007). "How Elvish were the Álfar?". Constructing Nations, Reconstructing Myth. Making the Middle Ages. 9. Brepols Publishers: 111–130. doi:10.1484/m.mmages-eb.3.3608. ISBN 978-2-503-52393-4. S2CID 163209884.
- Hultgard, Anders (2003). "Ár – „gutes Jahr und Ernteglück" – ein Motivkomplex in der altnordischen Literatur und sein religionsgeschichtlicher Hintergrund". Runica - Germanica - Mediaevalia. De Gruyter. pp. 282–308. doi:10.1515/9783110894073.282. ISBN 978-3-11-089407-3.
- Kroonen, Guus (2013). Etymological Dictionary of Proto-Germanic.
- Sundqvist, Olof (27 November 2015). "An Arena for Higher Powers: Ceremonial Buildings and Religious Strategies for Rulership in Late Iron Age Scandinavia". An Arena for Higher Powers. Brill. ISBN 978-90-04-30748-3.
- Sundqvist, Olof (18 December 2023). The Demise of Norse Religion: Dismantling and Defending the Old Order in Viking Age Scandinavia. De Gruyter. doi:10.1515/9783111198750. ISBN 978-3-11-119875-0.
- "frith". OED.
- "year". OED.
- "Ár". Old Icelandic Dictionary.
- "Friðr". Old Icelandic Dictionary.
