= Öndvegissúlur =

Viking period furniture

Öndvegissúlur (Icelandic pronunciation: [ˈœntˌveijɪsˌsuːlʏr̥]), or high-seat pillars, were a pair of wooden poles placed on each side of the high-seat—the place where the head of household would have sat—in a Viking-period Scandinavian house.

According to descriptions in Landnámabók and several sagas, written long after settlement of Iceland, some of the first settlers brought high-seat pillars with them from Norway. Once land was sighted, the high-seat pillars were thrown overboard, and a permanent farm was established where the pillars washed ashore. The first farm established in Iceland, located where the capital, Reykjavík, stands today, was allegedly founded using this method.

One saga refers to a high-seat pillar having been carved with an image of the god Thor, and Icelandic saga Eyrbyggja saga relates that when Þórólfur Mostrarskegg (Thorolf Most-Beard) constructed a temple after reaching Iceland, the high seat pillars had reginnaglar (Old Icelandic "god-nails" or "power-nails") in them. Otherwise, very little is known about what they might have looked like.

== See also ==
- Anthropomorphic wooden cult figurines of Central and Northern Europe
