= Gotland Runic Inscription 207 =

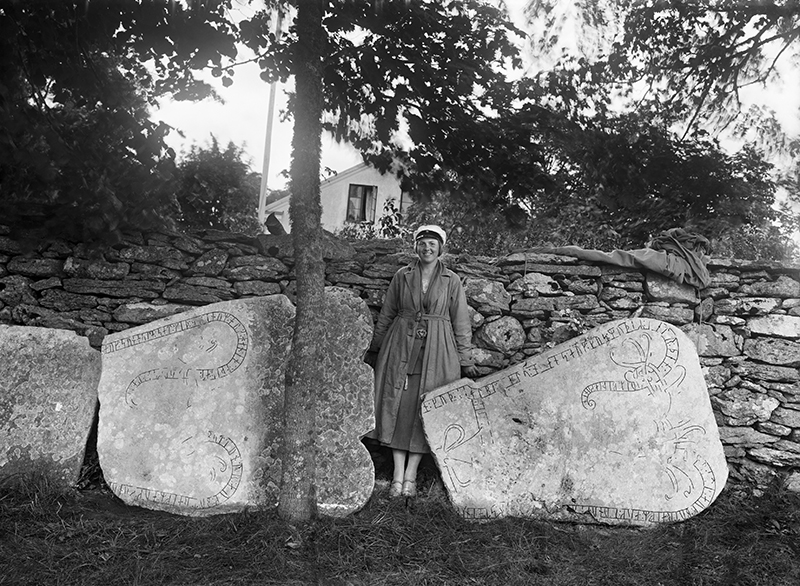
Young woman presenting G 207 to her right.

The Gotland Runic Inscription 207 is a Viking Age runestone engraved in Old Norse with the Younger Futhark runic alphabet. It is from c. 1100 and is located behind the organ in the tower room of Stenkumla Church on Gotland. It is raised in memory of a man who had been south with his comrades selling pelts, but he was killed in Ulvshale on the Danish island of Møn.

== Inscription ==
butmuntr : auk : butraifʀ : auk : kunu[ar : þaiʀ : raistu : stain ...arþi : karþ] : auk : sunarla : sat : miþ : skinum : auk : han : entaþis : at : ulfshala : þa : [¶ han : hil(k)(i)...]
Botmundr {} ok {} Botræifʀ {} ok {} Gunnvarr {} þæiʀ {} ræistu {} stæin ... {} garð {} ok {} sunnarla {} sat {} með {} skinnum. {} Ok {} hann {} ændaðis {} at {} Ulfshala/Ulvshale {} ... {} {} ... {} ...
"Bótmundr and Bótreifr and Gunnvarr, they raised the stone ... farm and sat in the south with the skins (= traded fur). And he met his end at Ulfshala/Ulvshale ..."
