= Alva Church =

- Alva kyrka
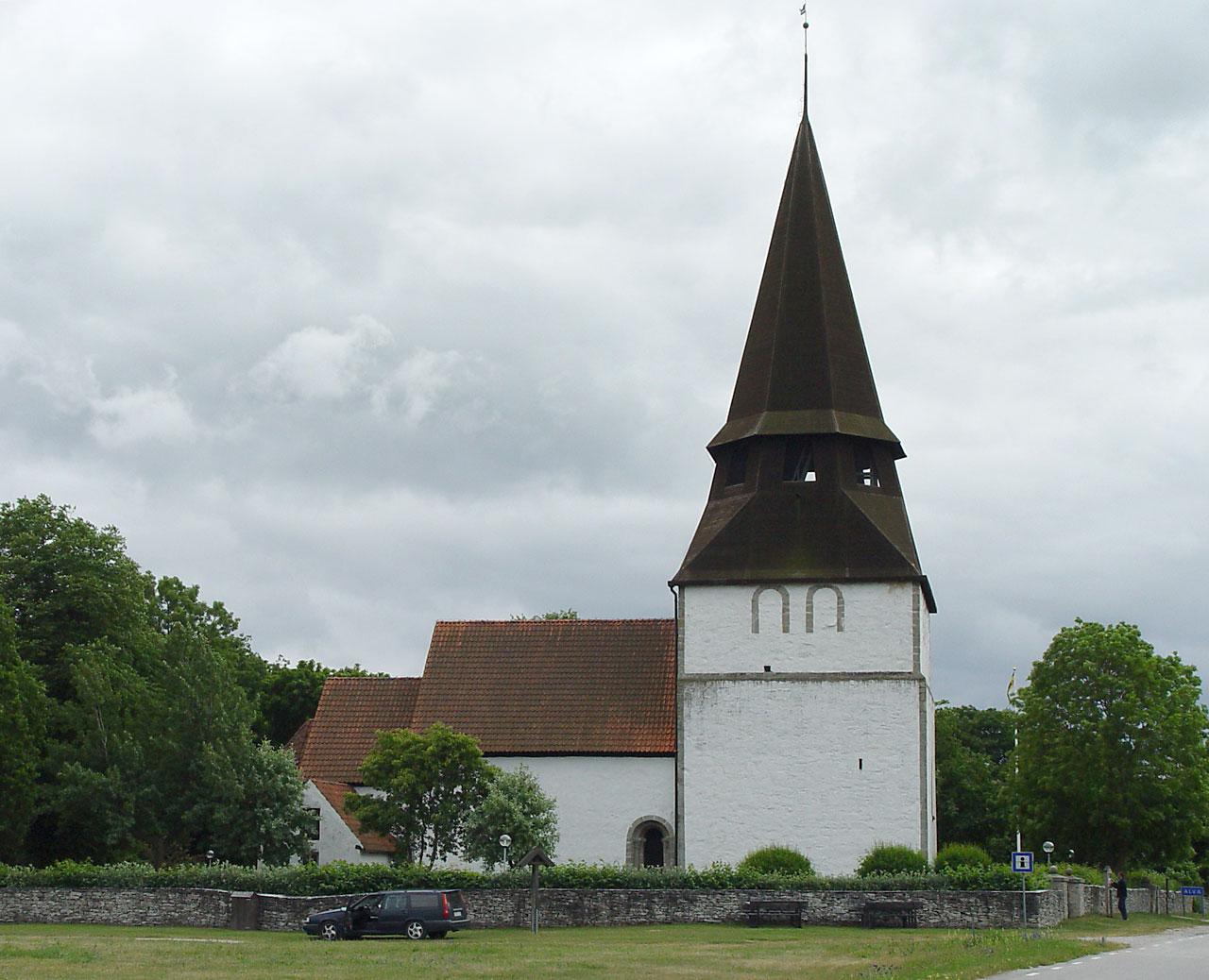
- Alva Church, external view

- Location on Gotland
- 57°12′27″N 18°21′41″E
- Country: Sweden
- Denomination: Church of Sweden
- Previous denomination: Catholic

Administration
- Diocese: Visby

Alva Church (Swedish: Alva kyrka) is a medieval church in Alva on the Swedish island of Gotland. The oldest parts of the church date from the late 12th century; with the halted construction of the tower about a century later, building activity ceased. The church contains medieval murals as well as a number of medieval furnishings and pieces of art. It lies in the Diocese of Visby of the Church of Sweden.

== History and architecture ==
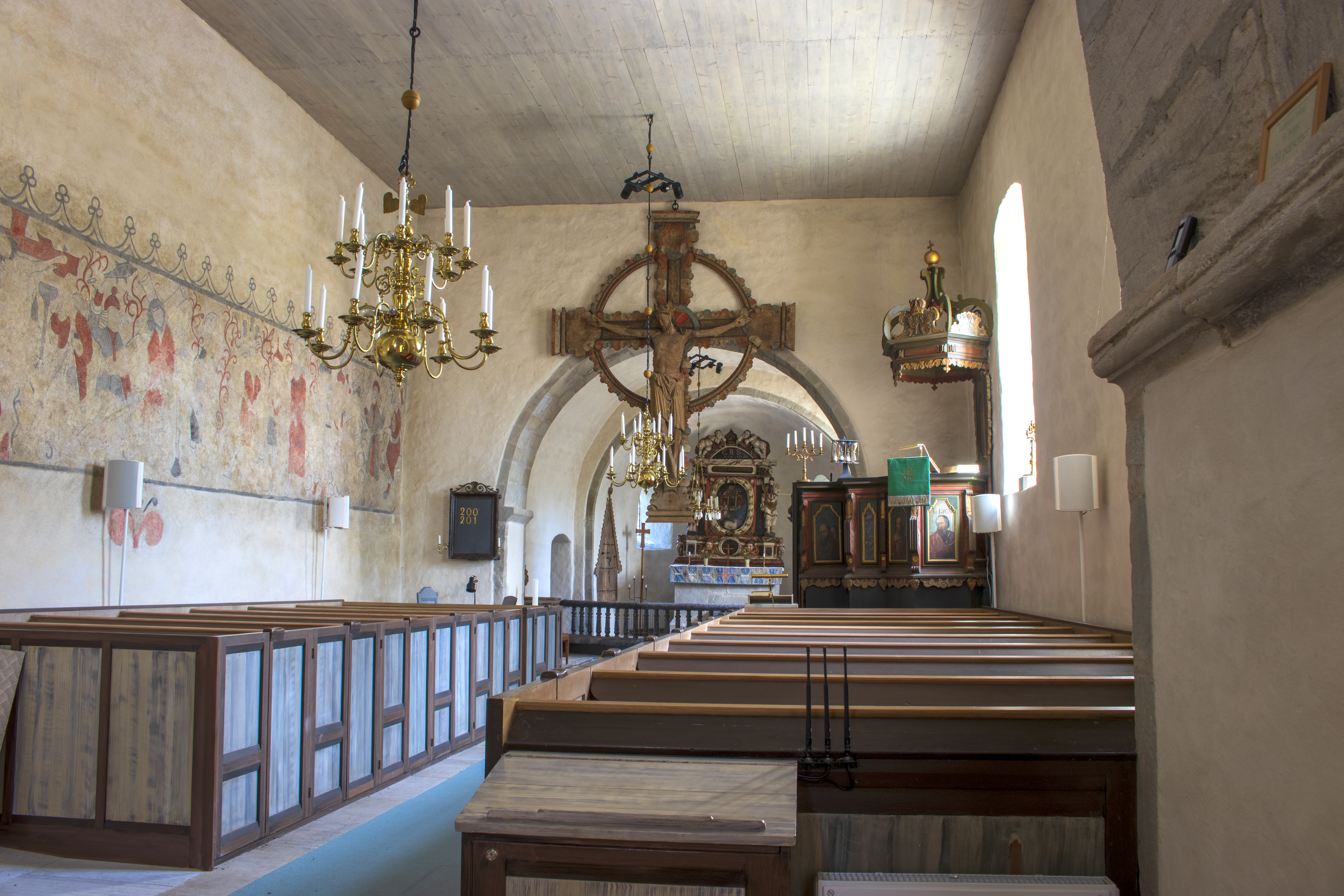
View of the interior towards to choir

The oldest parts of the church are the late Romanesque choir and the apse, dating from the late 12th century. To this the nave was added during the late part of the same century. Construction of the broad tower started about a hundred years later but was never finished; hence the somewhat squat appearance of the church today. Construction of the church appears to have come to a rapid end: apart from the half-finished tower, the main southern portal also seems to have been finished in a haphazard way.

The choir portal is Romanesque in style and carried some sculpted reliefs, possibly executed by the workshop or artist known as Sigraf. The similarly Romanesque northern portal of the church is also decorated with sculptures.

Inside, the church displays a set of wall paintings carried out at the end of the Middle Ages, probably just before the Reformation and possibly by the same artist who decorated Lau Church. Among the furnishings, the dominating triumphal cross, dating from the middle of the 13th century, and a partly preserved baptismal font, executed by the Romanesque workshop or sculptor referred to as Hegvald sometime during the end of the 12th century, are especially notable. The pulpit dates from 1740 and the unusually decorated altarpiece from 1653.

The church was renovated in 1953–54.

Alva Church belongs to the Church of Sweden and lies within the Diocese of Visby.
