= Alva, Gotland =

Alva
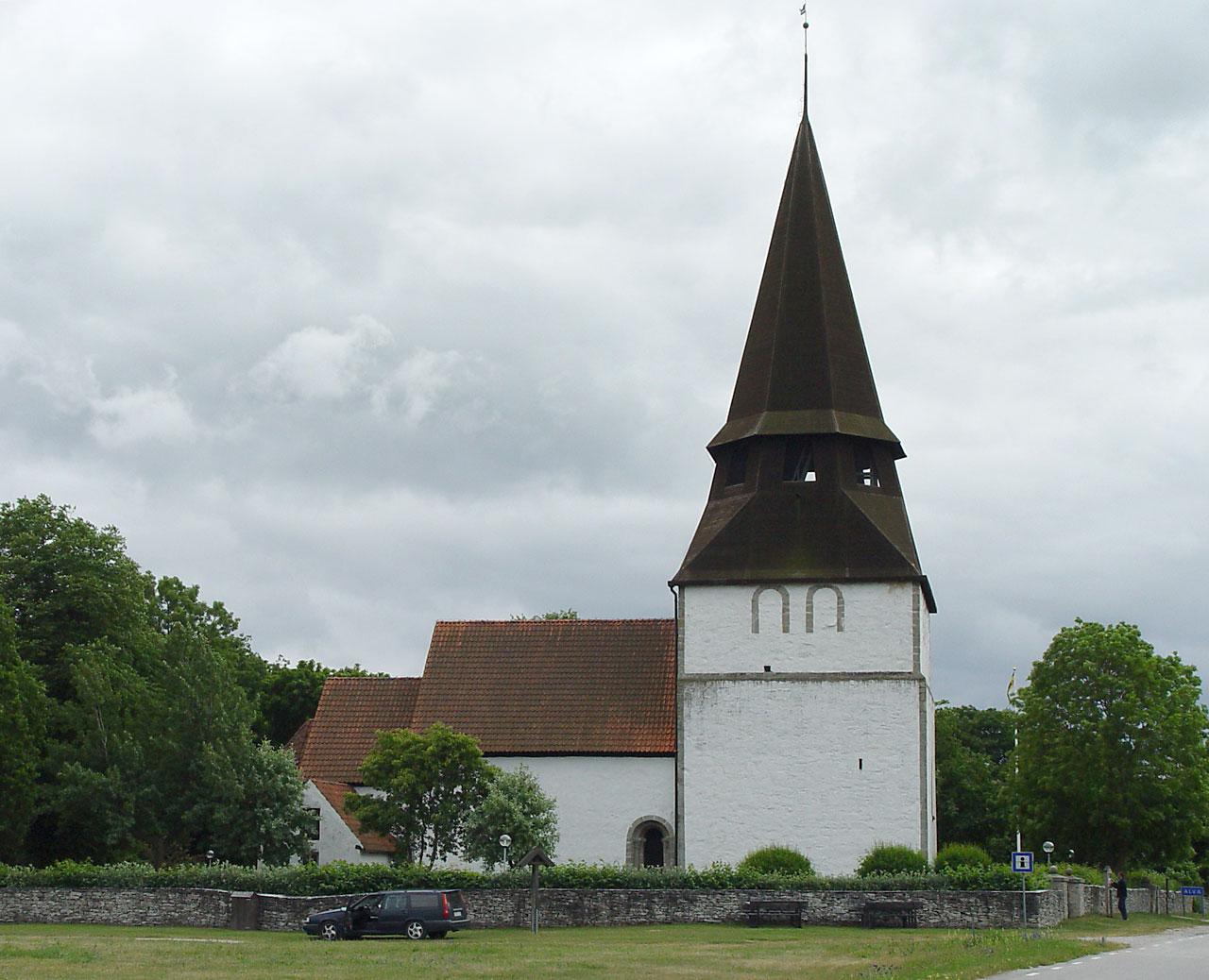
- Alva Church

- Location within Gotland
- Coordinates: 57°12′22″N 18°22′13″E
- Country: Sweden
- Province: Gotland
- County: Gotland County
- Municipality: Gotland Municipality

Area
  - Total: 233 km^{2} (90 sq mi)

Population (2014)
  - Total: 133
- Time zone: UTC+1 (CET)
  - Summer (DST): UTC+2 (CEST)

Alva is a populated area, a socken (not to be confused with parish), on the Swedish island of Gotland. It comprises the same area as the administrative Alva District, established on 1 January 2016.

== Geography ==
Alva is the name of the socken as well as the district. It is also the name of the small village surrounding the medieval Alva Church, sometimes referred to as Alva kyrkby. It is situated in the south part of Gotland.

As of 2019, Alva Church belongs to Alva-Hemse-Rone parish in Sudrets pastorat, along with the churches in Hemse and Rone.
