= Old Gutnish =

Early form of the Gutnish language spoken in Gotland and Fårö

- Region: Gotland
- Language family: Indo-European: Germanic; North Germanic; East Scandinavian; Old Gutnish

Language codes
- ISO 639-3: None (mis)
- Glottolog: gutn1238
- IETF: non-u-sd-sei
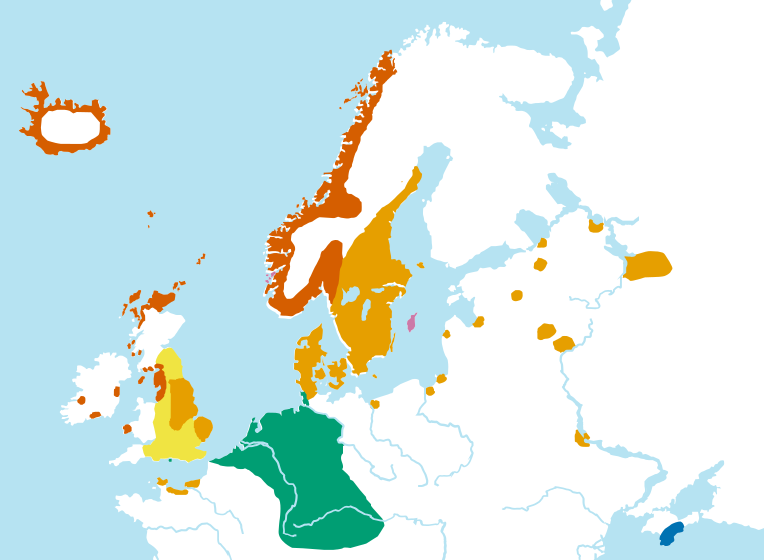
- The approximate extent of Old Norse and related languages in the early 10th century: Old West Norse dialect Old East Norse dialect Old Gutnish dialect Old English Crimean Gothic Other Germanic languages with which Old Norse still retained some mutual intelligibility

Old Gutnish was a stage in the development of the North Germanic language Gutnish, spoken on the Baltic island of Gotland and Fårö. The extant body of Old Gutnish is small, and Gutalagen and the Guta saga constitute its majority.

== Distribution ==
Old Gutnish was spoken on Gotland and Fårö, which lies to its north, during the Viking Age and Middle Ages.

== Linguistics and relation to other languages ==
Old Gutnish is ancestral to Modern Gutnish.

The root Gut is identical to Goth, and it is often remarked that the language has similarities with the Gothic language. These similarities have led scholars such as Elias Wessén and Dietrich Hofmann to suggest that it is most closely related to Gothic. The best known example of such a similarity is that Gothic and Gutnish called both adult and young sheep lamb.

The Old Norse diphthong au (e.g. auga "eye") remained in Old Gutnish and Old West Norse, while in Old East Norse – except for peripheral dialects – it evolved into the monophthong ǿ, i.e., a long version of ø. Likewise the diphthong ai in bain ("bone") remained in Old Gutnish while in Old West Norse it became ei as in bein and in Old East Norse it became é (bén). Whereas Old West Norse had the ey diphthong and Old East Norse evolved the monophthong ǿ Old Gutnish had oy.

Proto-Germanic	Old Gutnish	Old West Norse	Old East Norse
*augô (eye)	auga	auga	auga > ǿga
*bainą (bone)	bain	bein	bæin > bén
*hauzijaną (to hear)	hoyra	heyra	høyra > hǿra

== Extant texts ==
The body of Old Gutnish is smaller than that of the other attested Old Norse dialects. It includes runic inscriptions on Gotland such as G181 and G 207. Old Gutnish runic calendars have also been collected, including one dating to 1328 and one dating to 1578 which is now lost but is partly preserved in Analecta Gothlandensia Walliniana, compiled in the 1740s. The majority of Old Gutnish text is in the manuscript Holm B 64, which includes both Gutalagen and Gutasagan, and AM 54, 4^{to} from the Arnamagnæan Manuscript Collection which contains a version of Gutalagen with substantially more Danish linguistic influence.

== Language sample ==
Text from Gutasaga:

Þissi þieluar hafþi ann sun sum hit hafþi. En hafþa cuna hit huita stierna þaun tu bygþu fyrsti agutlandi fyrstu nat sum þaun saman suafu þa droymdi hennj draumbr. So sum þrir ormar warin slungnir saman j barmj hennar Oc þytti hennj sum þair scriþin yr barmi hennar. þinna draum segþi han firi hasþa bonda sinum hann riaþ dravm þinna so. Alt ir baugum bundit bo land al þitta warþa oc faum þria syni aiga. þaim gaf hann namn allum o fydum. guti al gutland aigha graipr al annar haita Oc gunfiaun þriþi. þair sciptu siþan gutlandi i þria þriþiunga. So at graipr þann elzti laut norþasta þriþiung oc guti miþal þriþiung En gunfiaun þann yngsti laut sunnarsta. siþan af þissum þrim aucaþis fulc j gutlandi so mikit um langan tima at land elptj þaim ai alla fyþa þa lutaþu þair bort af landi huert þriþia þiauþ so at alt sculdu þair aiga oc miþ sir bort hafa sum þair vfan iorþar attu.

Normalised orthography:

Þissi Þieluar hafþi ann sun sum hít Hafþi. En Hafþa kuna hít Huítastierna. Þaun tú bygþu fyrsti á Gutlandi. Fyrstu nát sum þaun saman suáfu þá droymdi henni draumbr, só sum þrír ormar várin slungnir saman í barmi hennar ok þýtti henni sum þair skriþin ýr barmi hennar. Þinna draum segþi han firi Hafþa, bónda sínum. Hann riaþ draum þinna só: “Alt ir baugum bundit, bóland al þitta varþa ok fáum þría syni aiga. Þaim gaf hann namn allum ófýdum. Guti al Gutland aiga, Graipr al annar haita ok Gunfiaun þriþi. Þair skiptu síþan Gutlandi í þría þriþiunga só at Graipr þann eldsti laut norþasta þriþiung ok Guti miþalþriþiung en Gunfiaun þann yngsti laut sunnarasta. Síþan af þissum þrim aukaþis fulk i Gutlandi só mikit um langan tima at land elpti þaim ai alla fýþa. Þá lutaþu þair bort af landi huert þriþia þiauþ só at alt skuldu þair aiga ok miþ sír bort hafa sum þair ufan iorþar áttu.

Translation to Icelandic:

Son hann Þjálfi átti sem hét Hafði. Og kona Hafða hét Hvítastjarna. þau tvö byggðu fyrst manna á Gotlandi. Fyrstu nótt sem þau þar saman sváfu þá dreymdi hana draum; sá hún þrjá orma vafðir saman í barmi hennar, og þótti henni sem þeir skriða niður barm hennar. Þennan draum sagði hún Hafða bónda sínum. Hann réð draum þann svo: "Allt er baugum bundið og verður allt land þitt búið og munum við þrjá syni eiga." Þeim gaf hann nöfn ófæddum, Goti sem Gotland á að eiga; Greipur sem annar hét; og Gunnfjón sá þriðji. Þeir skiptu síðan Gotlandi í þrjá þriðjunga, þá fékk Greipur sá elsti norður þriðjunginn, og Goti miðju þriðjunginn, en Gunnfjón sá yngsti fékk suður þriðjunginn. Seinna, af þessum þremur jókst eftir langan tíma svo fólk í Gotlandi það mikið að landið gat ekki öllum veitt fæði. Þá létu þeir fara burt af landi þriðja hvern þegn, og allt máttu þau eiga og með sér burt hafa sem ofanjarðar áttu.

Translation to English:

This same Þieluar had a son named Hafþi, and Hafþi’s wife was called Huitastierna. These two were the first to settle in Gotland. The first night that they slept together, she dreamed a dream. It was just as if three snakes were coiled together within her womb, and it seemed to her as though they crawled out of her lap. She related this dream to Hafþi, her husband, and he interpreted it as follows: ‘Everything in rings is bound. Inhabited this land shall be; we shall beget sons three.’ He gave them each a name, while they were still unborn: ‘Guti shall Gotland claim, Graipr the second by name and Gunfiaun the third.’ They later divided Gotland into thirds, in such a way that Graipr the eldest inherited the northern third, Guti the middle third and Gunfiaun the youngest inherited the southernmost. Subsequently, from these three men, the population of Gotland increased so much over a long period of time that the land was not able to support them all. Then they cast lots to send every third person away from the island, on the understanding that they should have a right to keep, and take away with them, everything that they owned in the way of moveables.

== Bibliography ==
=== Primary ===
- Guta lag: the law of the Gotlanders (PDF). Translated by Peel, Christine. London: Viking Society for Northern Research, Univ. College London. 2009. ISBN 978-0-903521-79-6.
- Guta saga: the history of the Gotlanders (PDF). Translated by Peel, Christine. London: Viking Society for Northern Research, Univ. College London. 2011. ISBN 9780903521444.

=== Secondary ===
- Hallberg, Göran (14 July 2008). "185. Dialects and regional linguistic varieties in the 20th century I: Sweden and Finland". In Bandle, Oskar; Braunmüller, Kurt; Jahr, Ernst Hakon; Karker, Allan; Naumann, Hans-Peter; Teleman, Ulf; Elmevik, Lennart; Widmark, Gun (eds.). Volume 2: Set Halbbd 1+2. De Gruyter Mouton. pp. 1691–1706. doi:10.1515/9783110197068-067. ISBN 978-3-11-019706-8.
- Vrieland, Sean D (2011). "Old Gutnish historical phonology and the Old Norse context". Universiteit Leiden.
- Wessen, Elias (1 December 2011). Die nordischen Sprachen (in German). De Gruyter. doi:10.1515/9783110826272. ISBN 978-3-11-082627-2.
- Nationalencyklopedin
