= Reginnaglar =

Word from Old Norse writings

Reginnaglar (singular reginnagli) is a word occurring twice in surviving Old Norse writings. Its meaning is unclear but it is a compound of reginn, "powers/rulers/gods/sacred" and naglar, "nails". Despite its rarity, the word has occasioned quite extensive scholarly debate because it may give insight into Old Nordic religion.

== Glælognskviða ==
The first attestation is in a rather cryptic kenning in stanza 10 of the skaldic poem Glælognskviða by Þórarinn loftunga, thought to date from 1030×34. In it, Þórarinn advises King Svein Knutsson of Norway, encouraging him to pray to his predecessor, Olaf II of Norway; the poem is among our earliest evidence for Olaf's status as a saint in Norway. One of the exhortations to Sveinn to pray runs

þás þú rekr
fyr reginnagla
bóka máls
bænir þínar

which appears literally to mean 'when you perform/present your prayers in front of the sacred nail(s) [reginnagla] of the language/speech/measure/inlaid decoration of books'. The main interpretations of the phrase 'reginnagla bóka máls' have been:

1. 'altar' or 'shrine' (taking the 'sacred nails of the language of books [i.e. Latin]' as a metonymy for the whole object)
2. 'priests' or 'St Olaf' (taking the 'sacred nail(s) of the language of books [i.e. Latin]' as a kenning either for priests generally or Olaf specifically)
3. 'liturgical book' (taking the 'sacred nails of the language/inlaid decoration of books' to refer to an ornamented book cover).

Of these, 'Olaf' has historically been the most common and 'liturgical book', suggested by Margaret Clunies Ross, the most recent (as of 2014).

== Eyrbyggja saga ==
The other attestation of reginnaglar is in the Icelandic saga Eyrbyggja saga, which relates the use of reginnaglar in the construction of a temple by Þórólfur Mostrarskegg (Thorolf Most-Beard):

Thereafter Thorolf fared with fire through his land out from Staff-river in the west, and east to that river which is now called Thors-river, and settled his shipmates there. But he set up for himself a great house at Templewick which he called Templestead. There he let build a temple, and a mighty house it was. There was a door in the side-wall and nearer to one end thereof. Within the door stood the pillars of the high-seat, and nails were therein; they were called the Gods' nails.

Here, the nails clearly represent some kind of metal, nail-like decorative feature of the high-seat pillars, and Clunies Ross sees it as plausible that despite the lateness of the source, it does represent a feature of pre-Christian material culture.

== See also ==
- Clay nail
- Öndvegissúlur
