= Ulvshale =

Peninsula in Møn, Denmark

Coordinates: 55°02′14″N 12°16′18″E

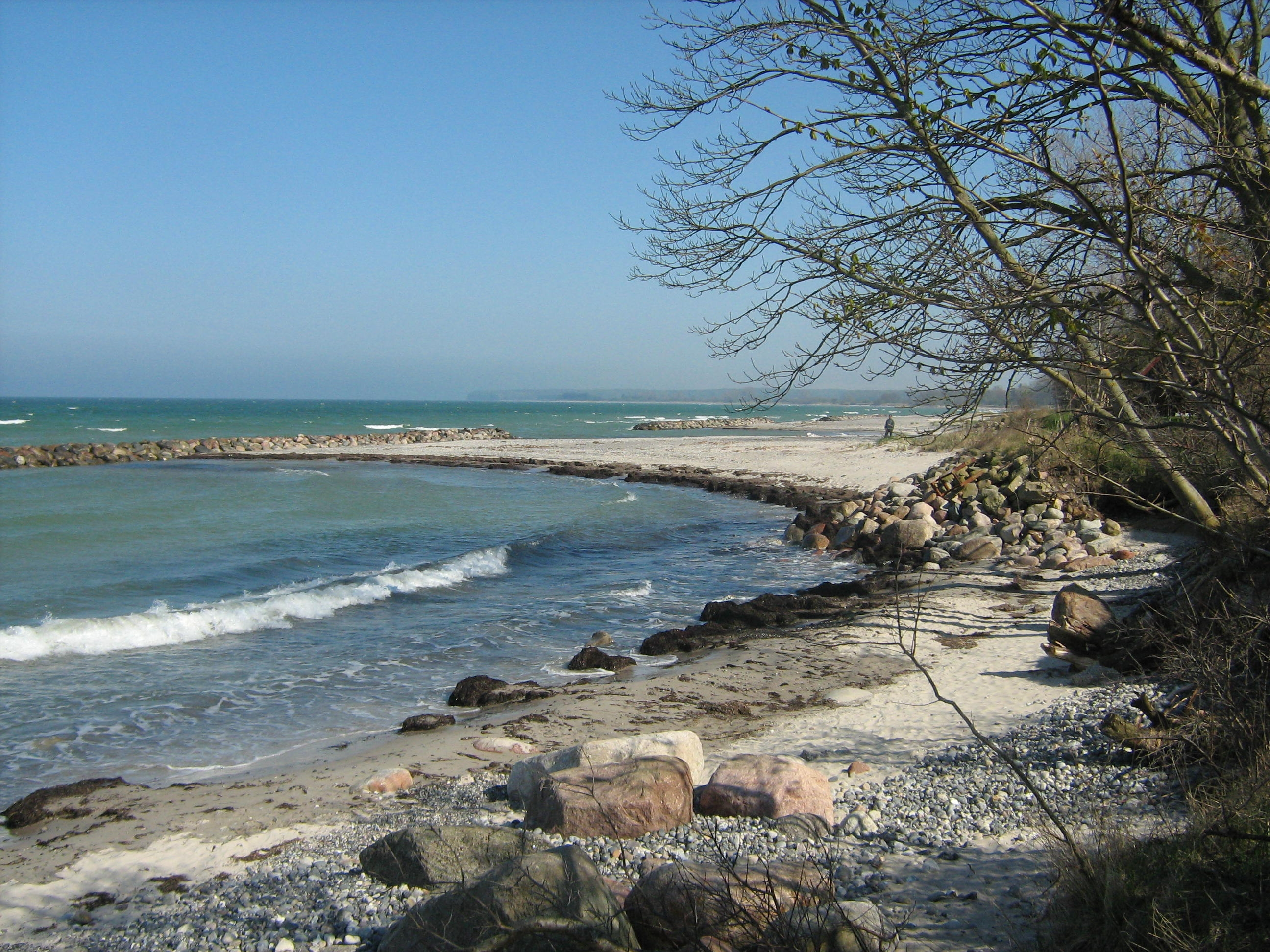
Part of the beach at Ulvshale

Ulvshale is a peninsula and small summer house locality in the north-western corner of the Danish island of Møn. Its long sandy beach and natural forest attract tourists, particularly in the summer months.

== The locality ==
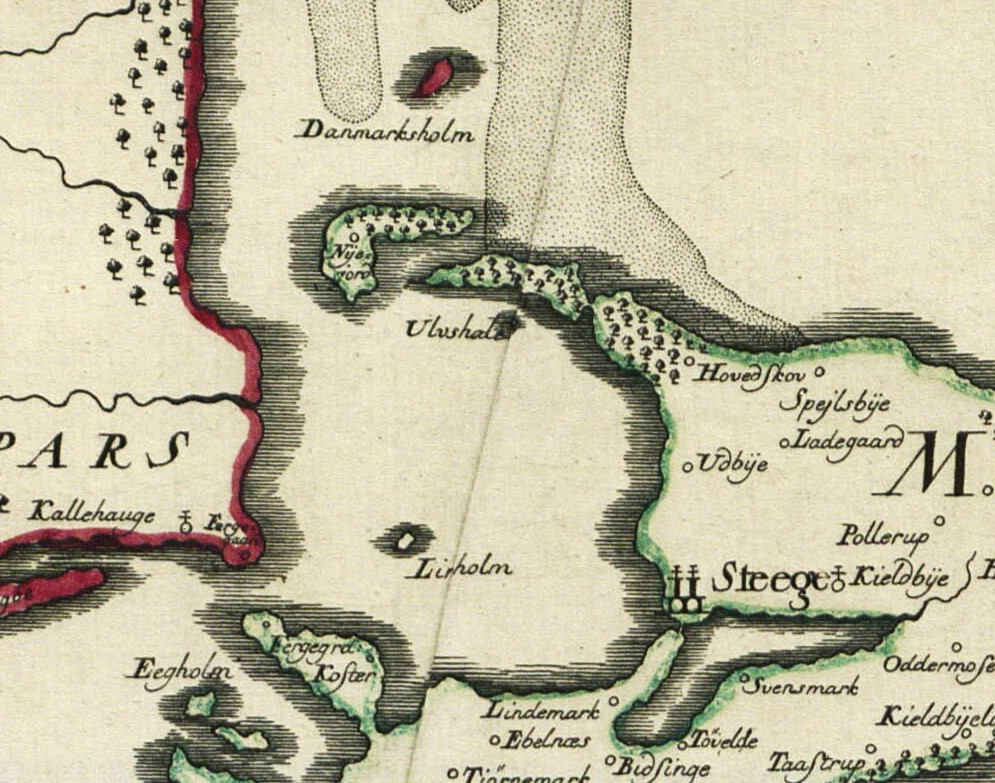
Uævshale seen on a map detail from 1763.

The locality of Ulvshale (which literally means "Wolf's Tail") stretches from Hegnede Bakke in the south east to Ulvshalegård in the north west. It consists mainly of summer houses along the sandy beach lined with small sand dunes. The earliest summer houses date from 1918, but many more were built in the 1930s and especially towards the end of the 20th century. Østersøbadet was built in 1930 as a seaside hotel but has since been used as a training centre for adults. There is a large camping ground at the northern end of the community between the summer house area and the forest.

== The forest ==
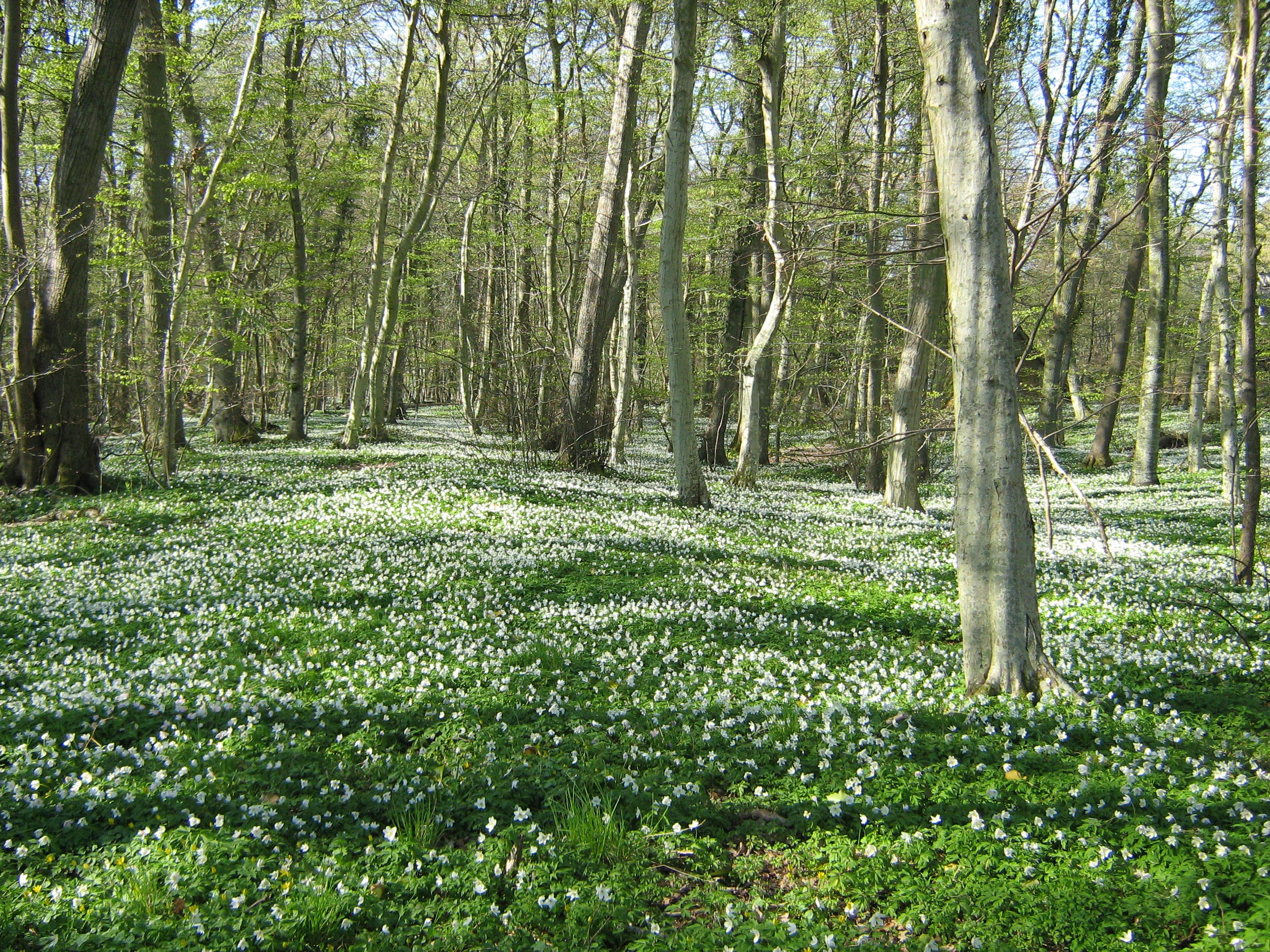
Ulvshale Forest in the spring

In the 17th century, the Ulvshave Forest consisted mainly of oak. Statistics from 1696 refer to 2,500 large oak trees. These were felled after a change in ownership in 1769 when the area began to be used as pasture for cattle and pigs. Despite complaints from local farmers, the forest was protected in 1839 under Danish regulations calling for the maintenance of all forests. New trees were planted in the middle of the 19th century, reviving the old forest.

Now covering half the peninsula, the forest has since been allowed to grow freely for a considerable time. Narrow paths take visitors through all the most common Danish trees including the aforementioned oak, as well as beech, birch, elm, aspen, ash, alder, and rowan.

== Pastures ==
The western side of the forested area is covered with extensive pastures offering excellent breeding grounds for a wide variety of birds including ducks, geese and herons as well as many migratory birds. The cattle and sheep grazing here improve conditions for the birds who feel safer when they can see all around thanks to the short grass.

== Flint ==
Driven by sea currents, the flintstone pebbles in the Ulvshave area stem from Møns Klint. A number of firms have exploited the resource, especially Ulvshave Stenværk. Møn is one of the few places in the world where flint is available for industrial use. Interest in exporting the resource began at the beginning of the 20th century and expanded especially in the 1920s and 1930s. The flint industry provided jobs for the local population for over 50 years until Ulvshale's Stenværk finally ceased operations in 1974.

== Gallery ==
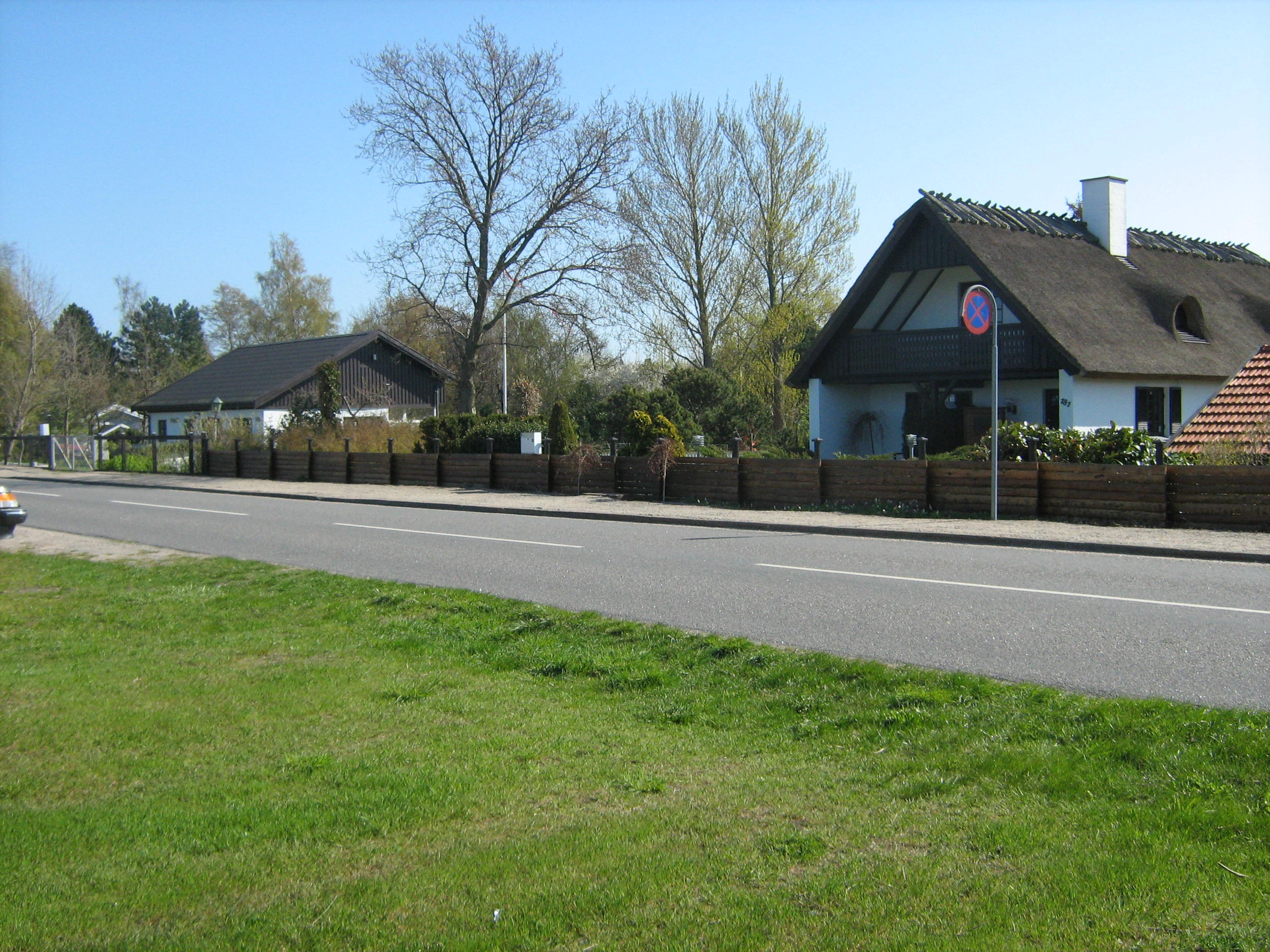
Summer houses on the sea front

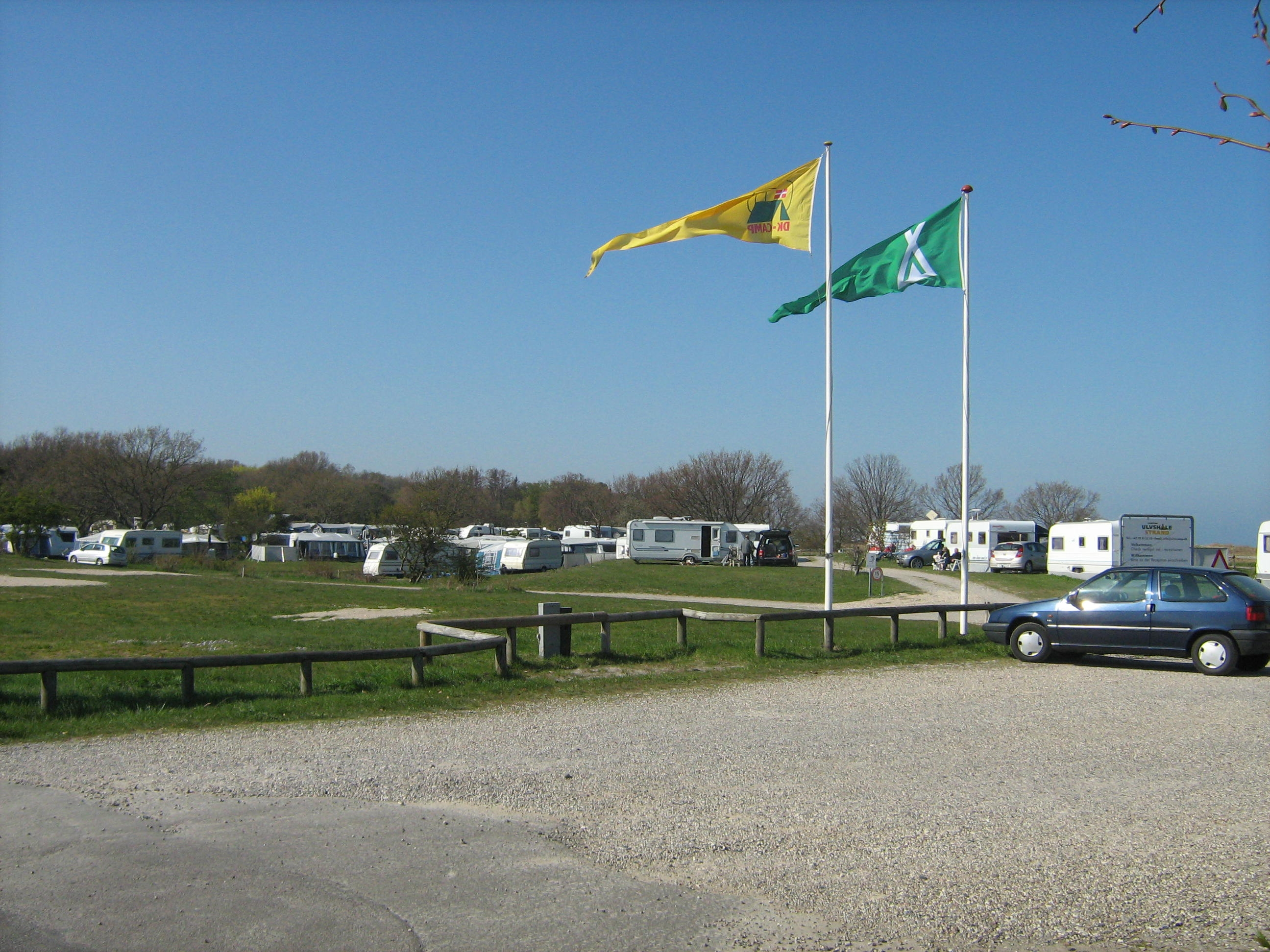
The camping site

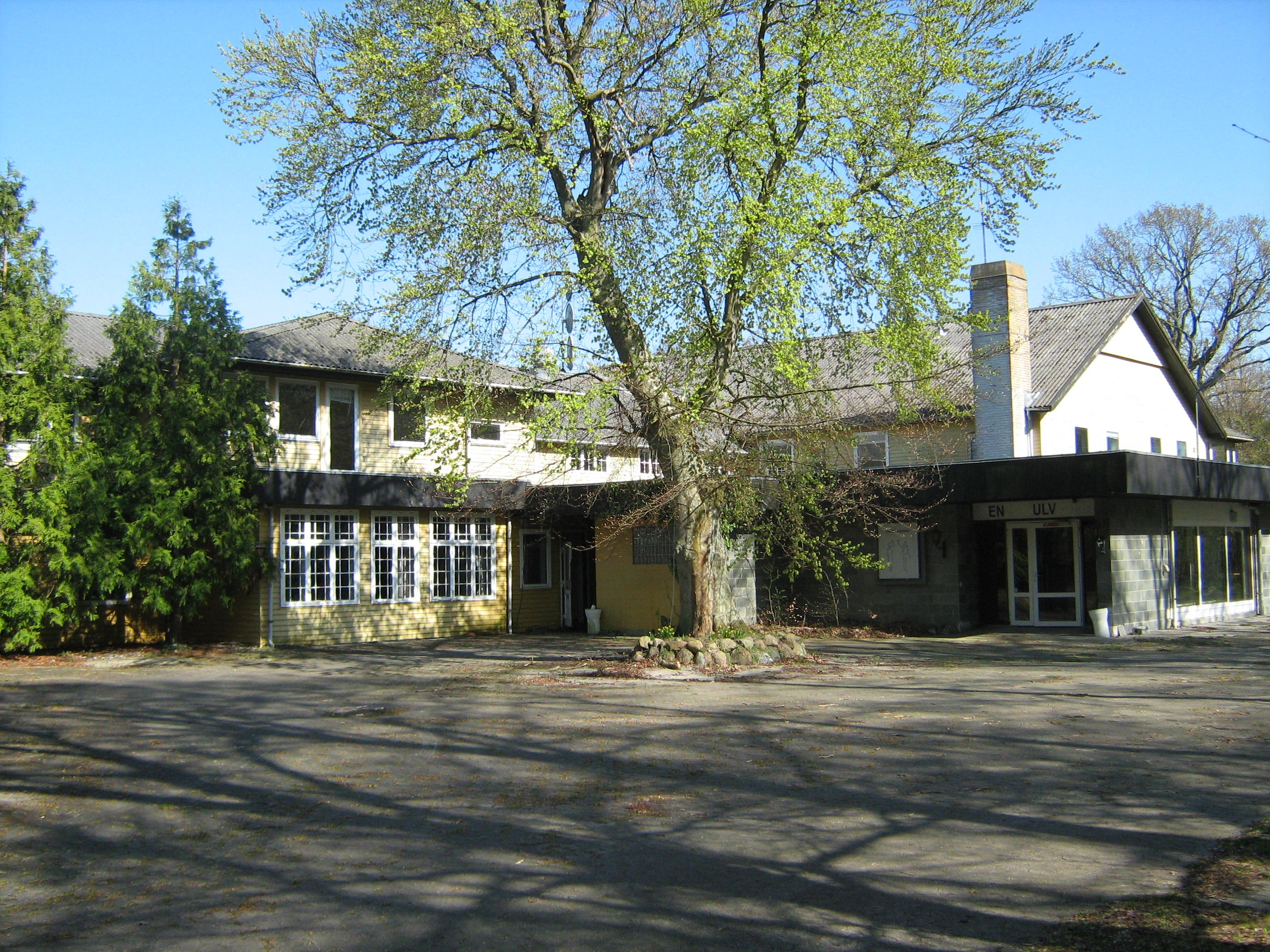
Ulvshale Center, once a hotel

== See also ==
- Nyord, a small island to the north of Ulvshale
