= Gutnish =

North Germanic language

- Gutnic
- Gutiske; Gutamål
- Native to: Sweden
- Region: Gotland, Fårö
- Native speakers: (~2,000–5,000 cited 1998)
- Language family: Indo-European: Germanic; North Germanic; East Scandinavian; Gutnish
- Early forms: Old Norse: Old East Norse; Old Gutnish
- Dialects: Mainland Gutnish (Laumål); Fårö Gutnish (Faroymal)

Language codes
- ISO 639-3: None (mis)
- Glottolog: gutn1238
- Gutnish is classified as Definitely Endangered by the UNESCO Atlas of the World's Languages in Danger (2010).

Gutnish (US: /ˈɡuːtnɪʃ/ GOOT-nish), or rarely Gutnic (Swedish: gutniska or gutamål), is a North Germanic language spoken sporadically on the islands of Gotland and Fårö. The different dialects of Gutnish, while stemming from the Old Gutnish (Swedish: Forngutniska) variety of Old Norse, are sometimes considered part of modern Swedish. Gutnish exists in two variants, Mainland Gutnish (Storlandsgutamål or Storlandsmål), mostly spoken in the southern and southeastern portion of Gotland, where the dialect of Lau became the standard form on the Main Island (Lau Gutnish → Laumål), and Fårö Gutnish (Gutnish: Faroymal; Swedish: Fårömål), spoken on the island of Fårö. UNESCO defines Gutnish as a "definitely endangered language" as of 2010.

Some features of Gutnish include the preservation of Old Norse diphthongs like ai in for instance stain (Swedish: sten; English: stone) and oy in for example doy (Swedish: dö; English: die). There is also a triphthong that exists in no other Norse languages: iau as in skiaute/skiauta (Swedish: skjuta; English: shoot).

Many Gotlanders do not understand Gutnish, and speak Gotlandic (Swedish: gotländska), a Gutnish-influenced Swedish dialect.

There are major efforts to revive the traditional version of Modern Gutnish. Gutamålsgillet, the Gutnish Language Guild, organizes classes and meetings for speakers of traditional Gutnish. According to the guild's webpage, there are now 1,500 people using Gutnish on Facebook.

== Phonology ==
=== Vowels ===
The contrastive vowels in Modern Gutnish are /ɪ/, /ʏ/, /e/, /œ/, /a/, /ɔ/, /u/. Of these, all but /u/ have a short and a long version. What is etymologically a long /uː/ has been broken into the sequence [ʉu].

A distinctive feature of Gutnish is the existence of a large number of sequences of vowel plus [ɪ] or [u] which form vocalic phonemes of their own. These sequences are the following: /eɪ/, /ɛɪ/, /œʏ/, /aɪ/, /ɔɪ/, /ʉu/, /eu/, /au/, /ɔu/.

Some of these sequences alternate with short vowels between different morphological forms of the same lexeme, cf. such pairs as "veit" /vɛɪt̪ʰ/ 'white' (f.) ~ /vɪt̪ʰː/ 'white' (n).

	Front				Central	Back	
	unrounded		rounded		Central	Back	
	short	long	short	long	short	short	long
Close	ɪ	ɪː	ʏ	ʏː	ʉ	u	
Close-mid	e	eː			(ə)	ɔ	ɔː
Open-mid	ɛ		œ	œː	(ə)	ɔ	ɔː
Open	a	aː					

- /e, eː/, when preceding other vowels, /r/, or post-alveolar sounds, have a tendency to be more open [æ, æː].
- [ə] can be heard after some elongated vowels.
- In Fårö Gutnish, /a, aː/ are further backed [ɑ, ɑː].
- /ɔ, ɔː/ may be realized as more close [o, oː] when preceding a sonorant.
- /u/ may be [ʊ] when unstressed.

=== Consonants ===
		Labial	Dental/ Alveolar	Post- alveolar	Retroflex	Palatal	Velar	Glottal
Nasal		m ⟨m⟩	n̪ ⟨n⟩		ɳ ⟨rn⟩		ŋ ⟨ng⟩	
Plosive/ Affricate	voiceless	p ⟨p⟩	t̪ ⟨t⟩	tʃ ⟨tj⟩	ʈ ⟨rt⟩		k ⟨k⟩	
Plosive/ Affricate	voiced	b ⟨b⟩	d̪ ⟨d⟩		ɖ ⟨rd⟩		ɡ ⟨g⟩	
Fricative	voiceless	f ⟨f⟩	s ⟨s⟩	ʃ ⟨sj⟩				h ⟨h⟩
Fricative	voiced	v ⟨v⟩						
Approximant			l ⟨l⟩		(ɻ ⟨r⟩)	j ⟨j⟩		
Rhotic	voiceless		r̥ ~ ɹ̥ ⟨r⟩					
Rhotic	voiced		r ~ ɹ ⟨r⟩					

- Voiceless stops /p, t̪, k/ may be aspirated [pʰ, t̪ʰ, kʰ].
- /ɡ/ may be heard as a fricative [ʝ] or as a fricative [ɣ], when before palatal consonants or in palatal positions.
- /k/ may be heard as palatalized [ç] when occurring before /v/. /v/ is then heard as [ʋ].
- /b/ may be lenited as a fricative [β] randomly in word-initial positions.
- Sounds /l, n̪/ may be heard as syllabic [l̩, n̪̩] when following consonants or especially in word-final positions.

== Lexicon ==
Gutnish has many words of its own that make it different from Swedish. The following is a small selection of Gutnish's everyday vocabulary:

Gutnish	Swedish	Danish	German	English
päiku	flickan	pigen	das Mädchen	the girl / maiden
sårken	pojken	drengen	der Junge / Knabe	the boy
russe	hästen	hesten	das Pferd / Ross	the horse
rabbis	kanin	kanin	Kaninchen	rabbit
träsket	sjön, träsk (in proper names)	søen	der See	the lake / mere
sjouen	havet	havet	das Meer / die See	the sea

== Status ==
Gutnish is now under strong influence from the Swedish standard language, both through speaker contact and through media and (perhaps most importantly) written language. As a result, Gutnish has become much closer to the Swedish standard language. Due to the island's Danish and Hanseatic period there were also influences from Danish and Low German. There are also many Gotlanders who do not learn the language, but speak a regionally colored variant of the standard Swedish (Gotlandic). This is characterized mainly by its intonation, but also by diphthongs and triphthongs, some lexical peculiarities as well as the infinitive ending -ä.

The Gutamålsgillet association, which has been working for the preservation and revitalization of Gutnish since 1945, estimates that Gutnish is spoken today by 2,000 to 5,000 people. How many are still passive, is not specified. However, an interest in Gutnish seems to be present: From 1989 to 2011, the radio show Gutamål ran in Radio Gotland, which regularly reached about 15,000 to 20,000 listeners, and in 2008 Gotland University offered their first course in Gutnish. Gutamålsgillet collects writings of authors and poets who write their texts in Gutnish, and maintains a Swedish-Gutnish dictionary and an ever-growing list of Gotlandic neologisms.

In 2022, a citizen of the island of Gotland asked to use her surname with the Gutnish ending -dotri (instead of Swedish -dotter). The authority appealed against the positive decision of the administrative court in Stockholm, but in the end, the Court of Appeal ruled that she was allowed to use a Gutnish surname.

== Examples ==
Nätt'l för manfolk u kungvall för kune.
Neie slags örtar för ymsedere.
Svalk di bei saudi, styrk di me dune
um däu jär djaupt i naudi nere!
Vävald pa raini, rindlaug i hagen
täusen sma kluckar gynnar ljaude.
Die aimar fran marki u rydmen av dagen
slucknar langum för livnes u daude.

— Gustaf Larsson, Um kvälden,

Staingylpen gärdä bryllaup,
langhalu bigravdä läik,
tra torkä di däu sigderäivarä
va fyrä komst däu intä däit?

— Nach P.A. Säve, Staingylpen,
