= Jiuxian =

Jiuxian may refer to the following places in China:

- Juntan Reservoir, also known as Jiuxian Lake, a reservoir in Shangrao, Jiangxi, China

== Towns, townships, and subdistricts ==
in Fujian

- Jiuxian Township, Songxi County, a township in Songxi County, Fujian
- Jiuxian Township, Shanghang County, a township in Shanghang County, Fujian

in Shanxi

- Jiuxian, Gu County (旧县), a town in Gu County, Shanxi
- Jiuxian Township, Shanxi (旧县), a township in Hequ County, Shanxi

in other provinces

- Jiuxian, Anhui (旧县), a town in Taihe County, Anhui
- Jiuxian, Beijing, a town in Beijing
- Jiuxian Subdistrict, Chongqing (旧县), a subdistrict in Chongqing
- Jiuxian Township, Gansu (九岘), a township in Ning County, Gansu
- Jiuxian, Henan (旧县), a town in Song County, Henan
- Jiuxian, Hubei (旧县), a town in Yuan'an County, Hubei
- Jiuxian, Shaanxi (旧县), a town in Luochuan County, Shaanxi
- Jiuxian Township, Shandong, a township in Dongping County, Shandong
- Jiuxian Township, Sichuan (旧县), a township in Wusheng County, Sichuan
- Jiuxian Subdistrict, Qujing (旧县), a subdistrict in Qujing, Yunnan
- Jiuxian Subdistrict, Tonglu County (旧县), a subdistrict in Tonglu County, Zhejiang
