= COVID-19 pandemic in Shandong =

- Disease: COVID-19
- Pathogen: SARS-CoV-2
- Location: Shandong, China
- First outbreak: Wuhan, Hubei
- Arrival date: 2020
- Confirmed cases: 1,017
- Active cases: 31
- Recovered: 979
- Deaths: 7

The COVID-19 pandemic reached the province of Shandong, China.

== Statistics ==
Division	Active	Confirmed	Deceased	Recovered
Shandong	31	5,013	7	979
Jinan	31	955	0	
Jining	31	285	0	
Yantai	31	88	0	
Dezhou	31	37	2	
Zibo	31	30	1	
Weihai	31	38	1	
Qingdao	31	81	1	
Linyi	31	49	5	
Overseas import personnel	28	214	0	186
Rizhao	3	31	0	28
Weifang	31	0		
Liaocheng	31	0		
Tai'an	31	35	2	95
Zaozhuang	31	5,010		
Heze	31	0		
Binzhou	31	955	7	

== Timeline ==
=== 2020 ===
On January 22, 1 new case was reported, and a total of 2 cases were reported. The new addition is a 38-year-old male, who works in Zhoushan, Zhejiang, and has close contact with a confirmed patient. He went to Weihai to visit relatives on the 18th and was quarantined on the 20th when he had a fever.

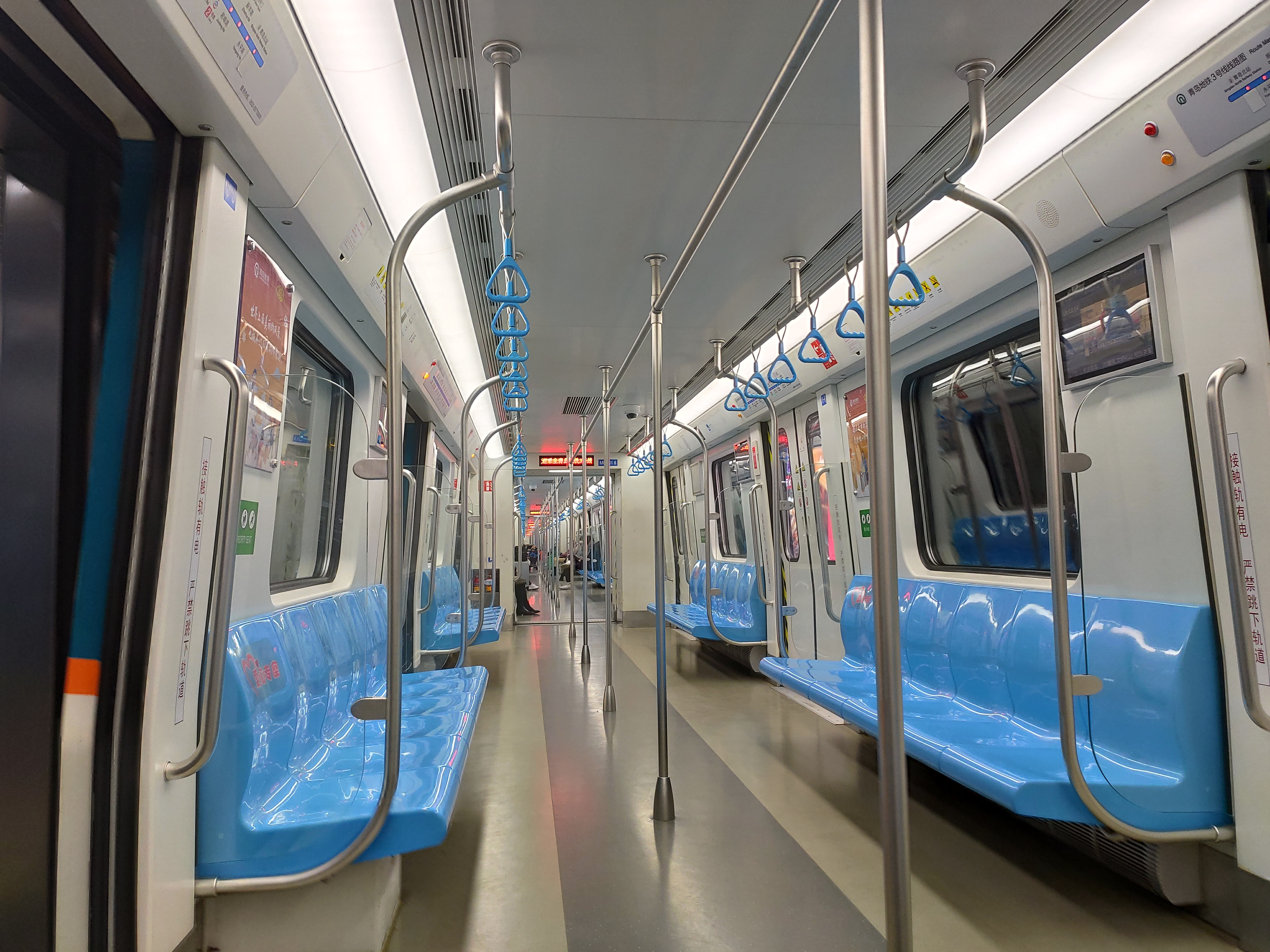
On January 23, 2020, the empty compartment No. 3016 of Qingdao Metro Line 3.

On January 23, 4 new cases were reported throughout the day on the 22nd. Linyi City reported two confirmed cases for the first time, and Qingdao City added two confirmed cases.

On January 24, the Shandong Provincial Health Commission notified six new confirmed cases, including 2 in Jinan, 2 in Yantai, and 1 in Jining, all of which were confirmed cases for the first time; 1 new confirmed case in Qingdao.

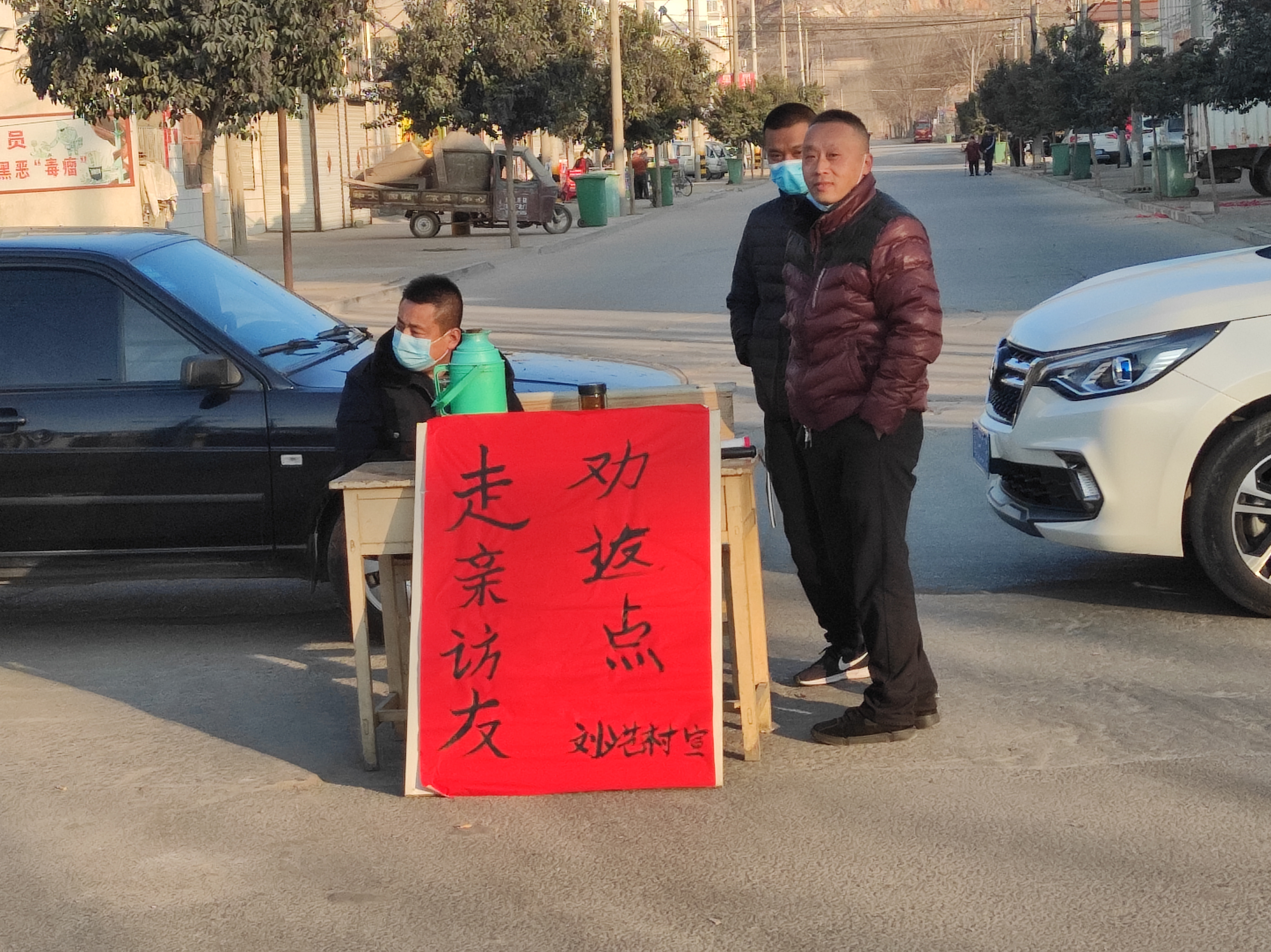
A "point of return for visiting friends and relatives" set up by the neighborhood of Liu Fan Village, Dongping Street, Dongping County, Shandong Province, near the entrance to the village, January 27, 2020

=== 2021 ===
On January 1, Qingdao City reported a confirmed case imported from the UK.

On January 2, Yantai City announced that an employee of an enterprise in another city was diagnosed as a confirmed case on January 1, and some of the auto parts packaging samples it distributed tested positive for nucleic acid. Some of the products flowed into Yantai City. After the inspection and review by the city and district CDC, one of the samples of the outer packaging of the goods from one of the enterprises was positive.

On January 4, the Shandong Provincial Center for Disease Control and Prevention conducted a whole-genome sequencing analysis of a sample of a British imported case reported in Qingdao, which was highly homologous to the sequence of the British variant strain. Since then, Shandong Province has become the third first-level administrative region in mainland China where the British variant was found after Shanghai and Guangdong.

On January 8, Rizhao City reported a confirmed case imported from Angola.

On January 16, Qingdao City reported a confirmed case imported from the United States.

On January 20, Qingdao City reported one new imported confirmed case from outside the province.

=== 2022 ===
==== January ====
On January 1, Shandong Province reported two newly imported confirmed cases, imported from Japan and the United Arab Emirates (2 cases in Jinan, of which imported cases from the United Arab Emirates were asymptomatic infections).

On January 2, Shandong Province reported one newly imported confirmed case, which was imported from the UAE (1 case in Jinan).

On January 3, Shandong Province reported one newly imported confirmed case, which was imported from Finland (1 case in Weihai).

On January 4, Shandong Province reported one newly imported confirmed case, which was imported from the UAE (1 case in Jinan).

On January 5, Shandong Province reported one newly imported confirmed case imported from Japan (1 case in Linyi).

On January 8, Shandong Province reported one newly imported confirmed case, which was imported from South Korea (1 case in Qingdao).

On January 14, Shandong Province reported three newly imported confirmed cases imported from South Korea (3 cases in Qingdao).

On January 16, Shandong Province reported one newly imported confirmed case, which was imported from the UAE (1 case in Qingdao).

On January 18, Shandong Province reported four newly imported confirmed cases imported from South Korea (4 cases in Qingdao).

On January 19, Shandong Province reported six newly imported confirmed cases, imported from South Korea (6 cases in Qingdao).

On January 21, Shandong Province reported one newly imported confirmed case, which was imported from South Korea (1 case in Qingdao).

On January 22, Shandong Province reported three newly imported confirmed cases, including two instances imported from South Korea (including 1 case in Jinan and 1 case in Qingdao) and 1 case imported from Malaysia (1 case in Qingdao).

On January 27, Shandong Province reported two newly imported confirmed cases, imported from Japan (2 cases in Qingdao).

On January 31, Shandong Province reported three newly imported confirmed cases imported from Germany (3 cases in Qingdao).

==== December ====
On December 3, Jinan issued the "Guidelines for Epidemic Prevention and Control in Public Toilets in Jinan City", and all public toilets strictly implement the "site code" scanning code to use the toilet, and check the nucleic acid test certificate.

Starting from December 5, Shandong will cancel the mandatory nucleic acid testing "landing inspection" requirements in traffic stations, port terminals, high-speed checkpoints and other places; enter parks, scenic spots, service areas and other public places, and take subways, buses, taxis and other public places. For vehicles, health codes and nucleic acid test negative certificates are no longer checked; when purchasing "four types of drugs" such as antipyretics, cough relievers, antivirals, and antibiotics, no nucleic acid test negative certificates are checked, and real-name registration information is no longer required.

On December 10, the Shandong authorities announced that all confined places must show a 48-hour negative nucleic acid test report.

On December 23, Bo Tao, director of the Qingdao Municipal Health Commission of Shandong Province, introduced that the daily number of new infections in Qingdao is 490,000 to 530,000 people, and will increase at a rate of 10% on the 24th and 25th.
