= Voiced velar fricative =

Consonantal sound represented by ⟨ɣ⟩ in IPA

ɣ
- IPA number: 141

Audio sample
- source · help

Encoding
- Entity (decimal): &#611;
- Unicode (hex): U+0263
- X-SAMPA: G
- Braille: ⠨ (braille pattern dots-46) ⠛ (braille pattern dots-1245)
Image

A voiced velar fricative is a type of consonantal sound that is used in various spoken languages. It is not found in most varieties of Modern English but existed in Old English. The symbol in the International Phonetic Alphabet that represents this sound is ⟨ɣ⟩, a latinized variant of the Greek letter gamma, ⟨γ⟩, which has this sound in Modern Greek. It should not be confused with the graphically similar ⟨ɤ⟩, the IPA symbol for a close-mid back unrounded vowel, which some writings use for the voiced velar fricative.

The symbol ⟨ɣ⟩ is also sometimes used to represent the velar approximant, which, however, is more accurately written with the lowering diacritic: [ɣ̞] or [ɣ˕]. The IPA also provides a dedicated symbol for a velar approximant, [ɰ].

There is also a voiced post-velar fricative, also called pre-uvular, in some languages. For the voiced pre-velar fricative, also called post-palatal, see voiced palatal fricative § Pre-velar.

== Features ==
Sagittal section of a voiced velar fricative

Features of a voiced velar fricative:

- Its manner of articulation is fricative, which means it is produced by constricting air flow through a narrow channel at the place of articulation, causing turbulence.
- Its place of articulation is velar, which means it is articulated with the back of the tongue (the dorsum) at the soft palate.
- Its phonation is voiced, which means the vocal cords vibrate during the articulation.
- It is an oral consonant, which means that air is not allowed to escape through the nose.
- It is a median consonant, which means it is produced by directing the airstream down the midline of the tongue, rather than to the sides.
- Its airstream mechanism is pulmonic, which means it is articulated by pushing air only with the intercostal muscles and abdominal muscles, as in most speech sounds.

== Occurrence ==
Some of the consonants listed as post-velar may actually be fricative trills.

For Basque, Gascon and the Iberian Romance languages (except Portuguese); see voiced velar approximant.

Language		Word	IPA	Meaning	Notes
Abaza		бгъьы/bğë	[bɣʲə]	'leaf'	
Adyghe		чъыгы/čëğë	[t͡ʂəɣə]	'tree'	
Albanian	Arbëresh Moresian (Pelloponesian) dialects of Arvanitika	gliata	[ɣliɑtɑ]	'tall'	
Alekano		gamó	[ɣɑmɤʔ]	'cucumber'	
Aleut		agiitalix	[aɣiːtalix]	'with'	
Angor		ranihɨ	[ɾɑniɣə]	'brother'	
Angas		γür	[ɣyr]	'to pick up'	
Arabic	Modern Standard	غريب/ğarīb	[ɣæˈriːb]	'strange'	May be velar, post-velar or uvular, depending on dialect. See Arabic phonology
Arabic	Baghdad Jewish	עסכרׄ (ʿáskaġ)	[ˈʕaskaɣ]	'army'	
Aromanian		ghini	[ˈɣi.ni]	'well'	Allophone of /ɡ/
Aramaic	Eastern	ܦܓ̣ܪܐ paġrā	[pʌɣrɑ]	'body'	Allophone of /x/ before voiced consonants.
Aramaic	Western	ܦܓ̣ܪܐ paġrā	[fʌɣrɔ]	'body'	
Azerbaijani	Northern	oğul	[oɣul]	'son'	
Azerbaijani	Southern	اوغول/oğul	[oɣul]	'son'	
Belarusian		галава/halava	[ɣalaˈva]	'head'	
Brahui		غُرِّنگ/ġurring	[ɣurːiŋɡ]	'to growl'	See Brahui language § Phonology.
Breton		plac’h	[plaɣ]	'daughter'	
Central Alaskan Yup'ik		auga	[ˈauːɣa]	'his/her/its blood'	Never occurs in word-initial positions.
Chechen		гӀала / ğala	[ɣaːla]	'town'	
Czech		bych byl	[bɪɣ bɪl]	'I would be'	Allophone of /x/ before voiced consonants. See Czech phonology. Occurs only in few Moravian dialects and even there it is rather /ɦ/
Dàgáárè		[pɔ́ɣɔ́]		'woman'	May be realized with features closer to a velar tap [ɡ̆] (a sound previously considered impossible according to the IPA chart), based on acoustic analysis.
Dinka		ɣo	[ɣo]	'us'	
Dogrib		weqa	[weɣa]	'for'	
Dutch	Standard Belgian	genoegen	[ʝ̠̊ə̟ˈnuɣʷœ̜]	'satisfaction'	Often (partially) devoiced. May be post-palatal [ʝ̠] instead. See Dutch phonology
Dutch	Southern accents	genoegen	[ʝ̠̊ə̟ˈnuɣʷœ̜]	'satisfaction'	Often (partially) devoiced. May be post-palatal [ʝ̠] instead. See Dutch phonology
English	Scouse	grass	[ɣrɑːs]	'grass'	Allophone of /g/. See British English phonology
English	Northumbrian				Burr
Georgian		ღარიბი/ğaribi	[ɣɑribi]	'poor'	May actually be post-velar or uvular
German	Austrian	rot	[ɣot]	'red'	Intervocalic allophone of /r/ in casual speech. See Standard German phonology
Ghari		cheghe	[tʃeɣe]	'five'	
Greek		γάλα/gála	[ˈɣala]	'milk'	See Modern Greek phonology
Gujarati		વાઘણ/vāġaṇ	[ʋa̤ɣəɽ̃]	'tigress'	See Gujarati phonology
Gweno		ndeghe	[ndeɣe]	'bird'	
Gwich’in		videeghàn	[viteːɣân]	'his/her chest'	
Haitian Creole		diri	[diɣi]	'rice'	
Hän		dëgëghor	[təkəɣor]	'I am playing'	
Hebrew	Classical	מִגְדָּל/miğdol	[miɣdɔl]	'[a] tower'	
Hebrew	Some Modern speakers (usually with a difficulty pronouncing [ʁ])	שׁוֹמֵר/shomer	[ʃo̞ˈme̞ɣ]	'[a male] guard', '[he] guards'	[ʃo̞ˈme̞ʁ] by other Modern speakers
Hindustani	Hindi	ग़रीब/garib	[ɣ᫢əriːb]	'poor'	Post-velar, conservative Hindi speakers usually replace it with /g/. See Hindustani phonology
Hindustani	Urdu	غریب/gharib	[ɣ᫢əriːb]	'poor'	Post-velar, conservative Hindi speakers usually replace it with /g/. See Hindustani phonology
Icelandic		saga	[ˈsaːɣa]	'saga'	See Icelandic phonology
Irish		a dhorn	[ə ɣoːɾˠn̪ˠ]	'his fist'	See Irish phonology
Istro-Romanian		gură	[ˈɣurə]	'mouth'	Corresponds to [ɡ] in standard Romanian. See Romanian phonology
Iwaidja		[mulaɣa]		'hermit crab'	
Japanese		はげ/hage	[haɣe]	'baldness'	Allophone of /ɡ/, especially in fast or casual speech. See Japanese phonology
Haketia	gher	[ɣeɾ]	'only'	appears as a phoneme in words from Arabic	
Kabardian		гын/gyn	[ɣən]	'powder'	
Karen	S'gaw Karen	ဂ့ၤ	[ɣē]	'good'	
Karen	Eastern Pwo	ၯိင်း	[ɣéɪɴ]	'house'	
Karen	Western Pwo	ဂၬထံၫ	[ɣaʔ tʰì]	'alcohol, liquor'	
Komering		harong	[haɣoŋ]	'charcoal'	
Korean		일흔	[iɾɣɯn]	'seventy'	Intervocalic allophone of /h/ before /ɯ/. See Korean phonology
Lezgian		гъел/ğel	[ɣel]	'sleigh'	
Lhaovo	Dago’	qid	[ɣìt]	'water'	
Lhaovo	Yunnan		[ɣək˧˩]	'water'	
Limburgish		gaw	[ɣɑ̟β̞]	'quick'	The example word is from the Maastrichtian dialect.
Lishan Didan	Urmi Dialect	עוטג/otogh	[ˠotʰoɣ]	'room'	Generally post-velar
Lithuanian		humoras	[ˈɣʊmɔrɐs̪]	'humor'	Preferred over [ɦ]. See Lithuanian phonology
Low German		gaan	[ˈɣɔ̃ːn]	'to go'	Increasingly replaced with High German [ɡ]
Macedonian	Berovo accent	дувна/duvna	[ˈduɣna]	'it blew'	Corresponds to etymological /x/ of other dialects, before sonorants. See Maleševo-Pirin dialect and Macedonian phonology
Macedonian	Bukovo accent	глава/glava	[ˈɡɣa(v)a]	'head'	Allophone of /l/ instead of usual [ɫ]. See Prilep-Bitola dialect
Malay	Standard	loghat	[loɣat]	'dialect'	Used in loanwords from Arabic that contain the sound. Replaced with /ɡ/ by Indonesian speakers. See Malay phonology
Malay	Johor	ramai	[ɣamaj]	'crowded (with people)'	Corresponds to prevocalic and intervocalic /r/ in Standard Malay and to uvular /ʁ/ in certain other Malay varieties such as Kedah Malay. Silent in word-final position.
Malay	Negeri Sembilan	ramai	[ɣamaj]	'crowded (with people)'	Corresponds to prevocalic and intervocalic /r/ in Standard Malay and to uvular /ʁ/ in certain other Malay varieties such as Kedah Malay. Silent in word-final position.
Malay	Kelantan-Pattani	ramai	[ɣama]	'crowded (with people)'	Corresponds to prevocalic and intervocalic /r/ in Standard Malay and to uvular /ʁ/ in certain other Malay varieties such as Kedah Malay. Silent in word-final position.
Malay	Terengganu	ramai	[ɣama]	'crowded (with people)'	Corresponds to prevocalic and intervocalic /r/ in Standard Malay and to uvular /ʁ/ in certain other Malay varieties such as Kedah Malay. Silent in word-final position.
Malay	Pahang	ramai	[ɣamɛ̃(ː)]	'crowded (with people)'	Corresponds to prevocalic and intervocalic /r/ in Standard Malay and to uvular /ʁ/ in certain other Malay varieties such as Kedah Malay. Silent in word-final position.
Malay	Sarawak	ramai	[ɣami]	'crowded (with people)'	Used within the Kuching and Saribas dialects. The Sibu dialect uses uvular [ʁ]. See Sarawak Malay
Malto		पेद़ग़े/peðġe	[peðɣe]	'to break open'	See Malto language § Phonology.
Mandarin Chinese	Central Mandarin (Dongping dialect)	俺/ǎn	[ɣän˥]	'I'	
Mandarin Chinese	Central Mandarin (Ningyang dialect)	鹅	[ɣə˦˨]	'goose'	
Mi'kmaq		nisaqan	[nisaɣan]	'weir'	Allophone of /x/ between sonorants. See Mi'kmaq language § Phonology.
Navajo		’aghá	[ʔaɣa]	'best'	
Neapolitan	Central Lucanian (Accettura dialect)	chiahäte	[kjaˈɣɜ tə]	'wounded'	Corresponds to /g/ in Standard Italian. The example "chiahäte" translates to "piagato" in Italian.
Nepali		कागज/kağdz	[käɣʌ(d)z]	'paper'	Allophone of /ɡ/ and /ɡʱ/ in intervocalic positions. See Nepali phonology
Ngwe	Mmockngie dialect		[nøɣə̀]	'sun'	
Northern Qiang		hhnesh	[ɣnəʂ]	'February'	
Norwegian	Urban East	å ha	[ɔ ˈɣɑː]	'to have'	Possible allophone of /h/ between two back vowels; can be voiceless [x] instead. See Norwegian phonology
Okanagan		ɣəɣicɣc	[ɣəɣitʃɣtʃ]	'Sparrow hawk'	
Pashto		غاتر/ğatër	[ɣɑtər]	'mule'	
Pela		[ɣɔ˥]		'to rain'	
Persian		باغ/bāq	[bɒːɣ]	'garden'	
Polish		niechże	[ˈɲɛɣʐɛ]	'let' (imperative particle)	Allophone of /x/ before voiced consonants. See Polish phonology
Portuguese	European	agora	[ɐˈɣɔɾɐ]	'now'	Allophone of /ɡ/. See Portuguese phonology
Portuguese	Some Brazilian dialects	mármore	[ˈmaɣmuɾi]	'marble', 'sill'	Allophone of rhotic consonant (voiced equivalent to [x], itself allophone of /ʁ/) between voiced sounds, most often as coda before voiced consonants.
Punjabi	Gurmukhi	ਗ਼ਰੀਬ/ġarib	[ɣə̄riːb]	'poor'	Less frequent in Gurmukhi varieties where it may be replaced by /ɡ/.
Punjabi	Shahmukhi	غریب/ġarīb	[ɣə̄riːb]	'poor'	Less frequent in Gurmukhi varieties where it may be replaced by /ɡ/.
Romani		γoines	[ɣoines]	'good'	
Russian	Southern	дорога/doroga	[dɐˈro̞ɣə]	'road'	Corresponds to /ɡ/ in standard
Russian	Standard	угу/ugu	[ʊˈɣu]	'uh-huh'	Usually nasal, /ɡ/ is used when spoken. See Russian phonology
Russian	Standard	горох же / goroh že	[ɡʌˈroɣ ʐe]	'the peas'	Allophone of /x/ before voiced consonants.
Sakha		аҕа/ağa	[aɣa]	'father'	
Sardinian	Nuorese dialect	súghere	[ˈsuɣɛrɛ]	'to suck'	Allophone of /ɡ/
Scottish Gaelic		laghail	[ɫ̪ɤɣal]	'lawful'	More advanced than other velars. See Scottish Gaelic phonology
Serbo-Croatian		ovih bi	[ǒ̞ʋiɣ bi]	'of these would'	Allophone of /x/ before voiced consonants. See Serbo-Croatian phonology
Shughni		ɣ̌īštow	[ɣiːʃtoːʷ]	'to bark'	See Shughni phonology
Sindhi		غم/ġamu	[ɣəmʊ]	'sadness'	
Slovak		bäch bäl	[bɛɐ̯ɣ bɛɐ̯l]	'I could be'	Allophone of /x/ before voiced consonants. See Slovak phonology.
Slovene	Standard	h gori	[ˈɣ‿ɡɔ̀ːɾí]	'to the mountain'	Allophone of /x/ before voiced obstruents. See Slovene phonology
Slovene	Some dialects	gajba	[ˈɣáːjbà]	'crate'	Corresponds to /ɡ/ in Standard Slovene. See Slovene phonology
Swahili		ghali	[ɣali]	'expensive'	
Swedish	Västerbotten Norrland dialects	meg	[mɪːɣ]	'me'	Allophone of /ɡ/. Occurs between vowels and in word-final positions. Here also /∅/ in Kalix.
Tadaksahak		zog	[zoɣ]	'war'	
Tajik		ғафс/cafs	[ɣafs]	'thick'	
Tamazight		aɣilas (aghilas)	[aɣilas]	'leopard'	
Tamil	Sri Lankan	பகை/pakai	[pɐɣɛ(i̯)]	'hate'	Intervocalic singular /k/ has debuccalized for most except in Brahmin and Sri Lankan Tamil. In total it can be [kʰ x ɡ ɣ ɣʰ h]
Turkish	Non-standard	ağaç	[aɣat͡ʃ]	'tree'	Deleted in most dialects. See Turkish phonology
Tutchone	Northern	ihghú	[ihɣǔ]	'tooth'	
Tutchone	Southern	ghra	[ɣra]	'baby'	
Tyap		ghan	[ˈɣan]	'to hurry'	
Ukrainian		чахохбі́лі	[tʃɐxoɣˈbil⁽ʲ⁾i]	‘chakhokhbili’	Occurs in specific rare cases only.
Uzbek		ёмғир / yomgʻir	[ʝɒ̜mˈʁ̟ɨɾ̪]	'rain'	Post-velar.
Vietnamese		ghế	[ɣe˧˥]	'chair'	See Vietnamese phonology
West Frisian		drage	[ˈdraːɣə]	'to carry'	Never occurs in word-initial positions.
Wu Chinese	Northern (Jinsha variety)	合	[ɣuoʔ˨˦]	'to join'	
Xiang Chinese	Old (Loudi variety)	湖南	[ɣu˩˧nia˩˧]	'Hunan (province)'	
Yi		ꊋ/we	[ɣɤ˧]	'win'	
Zhuang		Lwg roegbit	[lɯ˧ ɣo˧pi˥]	'Wild duckling'	

== See also ==
- Index of phonetics articles
- Voiceless velar fricative
- Guttural

== Notes ==
Place →	Labial					Coronal										Dorsal					Laryngeal			
Manner ↓	Bilabial		Labiodental		Linguolabial		Dental		Alveolar		Postalveolar		Retroflex		(Alveolo-)palatal		Velar		Uvular		Pharyngeal/epiglottal		Glottal	
Nasal	m̥	m	ɱ̊	ɱ		n̼	n̪̊	n̪	n̥	n	n̠̊	n̠	ɳ̊	ɳ	ɲ̊	ɲ	ŋ̊	ŋ	ɴ̥	ɴ				
Plosive	p	b	p̪	b̪	t̼	d̼	t̪	d̪	t	d			ʈ	ɖ	c	ɟ	k	ɡ	q	ɢ	ʡ		ʔ	
Sibilant affricate							t̪s̪	d̪z̪	ts	dz	t̠ʃ	d̠ʒ	tʂ	dʐ	tɕ	dʑ								
Non-sibilant affricate	pɸ	bβ	p̪f	b̪v			t̪θ	d̪ð	tɹ̝̊	dɹ̝	t̠ɹ̠̊˔	d̠ɹ̠˔			cç	ɟʝ	kx	ɡɣ	qχ	ɢʁ	ʡʜ	ʡʢ	ʔh	
Sibilant fricative							s̪	z̪	s	z	ʃ	ʒ	ʂ	ʐ	ɕ	ʑ								
Non-sibilant fricative	ɸ	β	f	v	θ̼	ð̼	θ	ð	θ̠	ð̠	ɹ̠̊˔	ɹ̠˔	ɻ̊˔	ɻ˔	ç	ʝ	x	ɣ	χ	ʁ	ħ	ʕ	h	ɦ
Approximant		β̞		ʋ				ð̞		ɹ		ɹ̠		ɻ		j		ɰ						˷
Tap/flap		ⱱ̟		ⱱ					ɾ̥	ɾ			ɽ̊	ɽ						ɢ̆		ʡ̆		
Trill	ʙ̥	ʙ							r̥	r		r̠	ɽ̊r̥	ɽr					ʀ̥	ʀ	ʜ	ʢ		
Lateral affricate									tɬ	dɮ			tꞎ	d𝼅	c𝼆	ɟʎ̝	k𝼄	ɡʟ̝						
Lateral fricative							ɬ̪		ɬ	ɮ			ꞎ	𝼅	𝼆	ʎ̝	𝼄	ʟ̝						
Lateral approximant								l̪	l̥	l		l̠	ɭ̊	ɭ	ʎ̥	ʎ	ʟ̥	ʟ		ʟ̠				
Lateral tap/flap									ɺ̥	ɺ			𝼈̊	𝼈		ʎ̆		ʟ̆						

		BL	LD	D	A	PA	RF	P	V	U
Implosive	Voiced	ɓ			ɗ		ᶑ	ʄ	ɠ	ʛ
Implosive	Voiceless	ɓ̥			ɗ̥		ᶑ̊	ʄ̊	ɠ̊	ʛ̥
Ejective	Stop	pʼ			tʼ		ʈʼ	cʼ	kʼ	qʼ
Ejective	Affricate		p̪fʼ	tθʼ	tsʼ	tʃʼ	tʂʼ	tɕʼ	kxʼ	qχʼ
Ejective	Fricative	ɸʼ	fʼ	θʼ	sʼ	ʃʼ	ʂʼ	ɕʼ	xʼ	χʼ
Ejective	Lateral affricate				tɬʼ			c𝼆ʼ	k𝼄ʼ	q𝼄ʼ
Ejective	Lateral fricative				ɬʼ					
Click (top: velar; bottom: uvular)	Tenuis	kʘ qʘ		kǀ qǀ	kǃ qǃ		k𝼊 q𝼊	kǂ qǂ		
Click (top: velar; bottom: uvular)	Voiced	ɡʘ ɢʘ		ɡǀ ɢǀ	ɡǃ ɢǃ		ɡ𝼊 ɢ𝼊	ɡǂ ɢǂ		
Click (top: velar; bottom: uvular)	Nasal	ŋʘ ɴʘ		ŋǀ ɴǀ	ŋǃ ɴǃ		ŋ𝼊 ɴ𝼊	ŋǂ ɴǂ	ʞ	
Click (top: velar; bottom: uvular)	Tenuis lateral				kǁ qǁ					
Click (top: velar; bottom: uvular)	Voiced lateral				ɡǁ ɢǁ					
Click (top: velar; bottom: uvular)	Nasal lateral				ŋǁ ɴǁ					
