= Jiuxian, Beijing =

Jiuxian Town 旧县镇
- Town
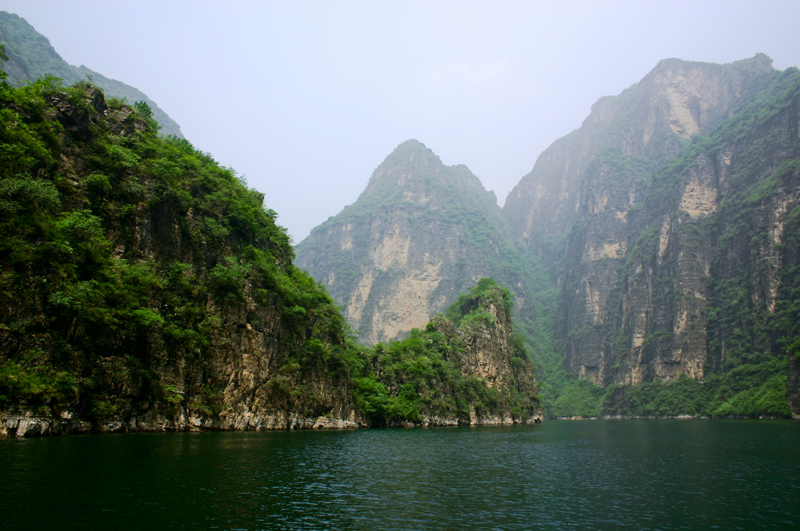
- Longqing Gorge near Gucheng Village, 2005

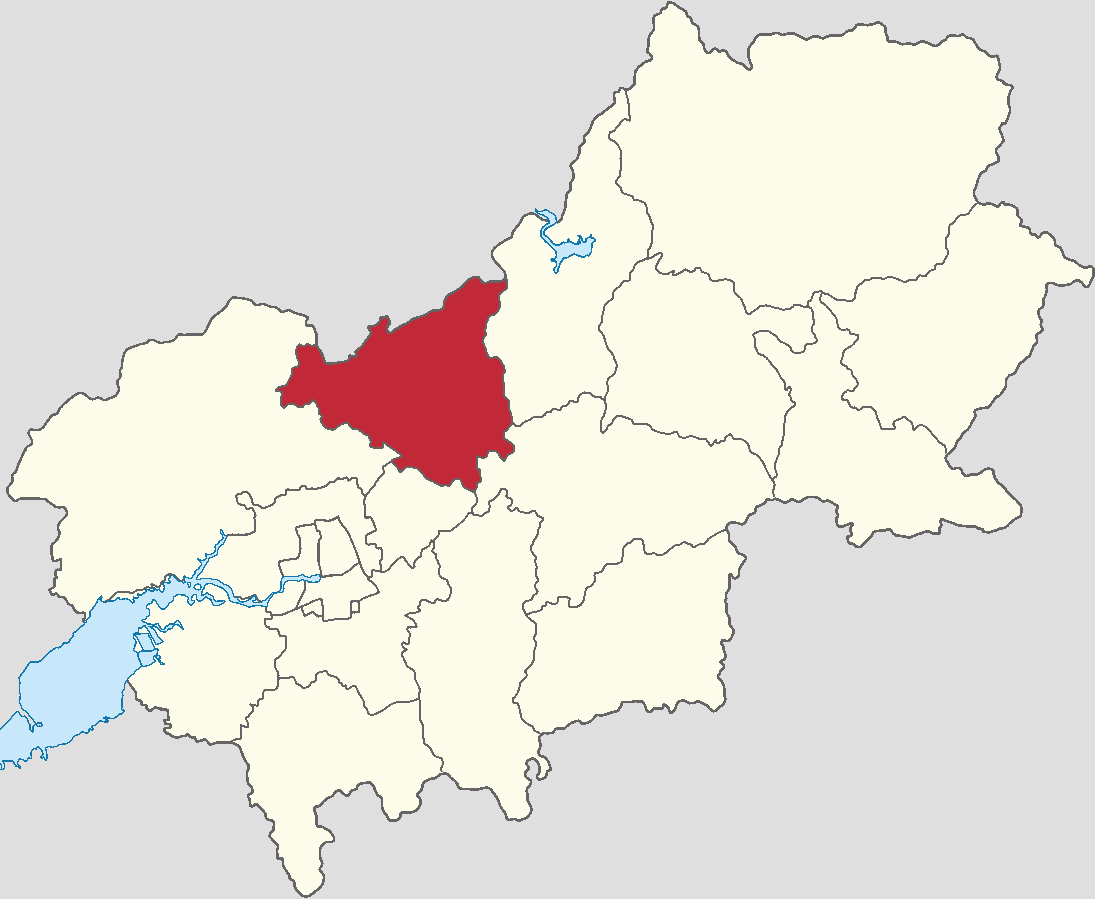
- Location within Yanqing District

- Location within Beijing Location within China
- Coordinates: 40°32′57″N 116°04′51″E
- Country: China
- Municipality: Beijing
- District: Yanqing
- Village-level Divisions: 1 communities 22 villages

Area
  - Total: 114.9 km^{2} (44.4 sq mi)
- Elevation: 524 m (1,719 ft)

Population (2020)
  - Total: 17,676
  - Density: 153.8/km^{2} (398.4/sq mi)
- Time zone: UTC+8 (China Standard)
- Postal code: 102109
- Area code: 010

Jiuxian Town (simplified Chinese: 旧县镇; traditional Chinese: 舊縣鎮; pinyin: Jiùxiàn Zhèn), is a town in the Yanqing District of Beijing. It shares border with Houcheng Town in its north, Xiangying Township and Yongning Town in its east, Shenjiaying Town in its south, and Zhangshanying Town in its west. In 2020, it was home to 17,676 inhabitants.

The name Jiuxian is referring to the town's past status as the county center of Yanqing. It used to be the county seat of Jinshan County (缙山, later renamed to Longqing County and then Yanqing County) until 1316.

== Geography ==
Jiuxian Town is bounded by a collection of mountains along its northern boundary with Houcheng, Hebei. Bayu Road passes through the southeast of the town.

== History ==
Timeline of Jiuxian's History
Time	Status	Within
1958 - 1961	Yongning People's Commune	Yanqing County, Beijing
1961 - 1983	Jiuxian People's Commune	Yanqing County, Beijing
1983 - 1995	Jiuxian Township	Yanqing County, Beijing
1995 - 2015	Jiuxian Town	Yanqing County, Beijing
2015–present	Jiuxian Town	Yanqing District, Beijing

== Administrative divisions ==
So far in 2021, Jiuxian Town covers 23 subdivisions, including 1 community and 22 villages. They are listed as follows:

Subdivision names	Name transliterations	Type
旧县镇	Jiuxianzhen	Community
白草洼	Baicaowa	Village
三里庄	Sanlizhuang	Village
烧窑峪	Shaoyaoyu	Village
北张庄	Beizhangzhuang	Village
白羊峪	Baiyangyu	Village
黄峪口	Huangyukou	Village
白河堡	Baihepu	Village
闫家庄	Yanjiazhuang	Village
耿家营	Gengjiaying	Village
车坊	Chefang	Village
旧县	Jiuxian	Village
东羊坊	Dongyangfang	Village
米粮屯	Miliangtun	Village
古城	Gucheng	Village
常家营	Changjiaying	Village
常里营	Changliying	Village
盆窑	Penyao	Village
团山	Tuanshan	Village
大柏老	Da Bailao	Village
小柏老	Xiao Bailao	Village
西龙湾	Xi Longwan	Village
东龙湾	Dong Longwan	Village

== Landmark ==
- Longqing Gorge

== See also ==
- List of township-level divisions of Beijing
