= Shanglaozhuang Township =

- Township

Chinese transcription(s)
  - Simplified: 商老庄乡
  - Traditional: 商老莊鄉
  - Pinyin: Shānglăozhuāng Xiāng
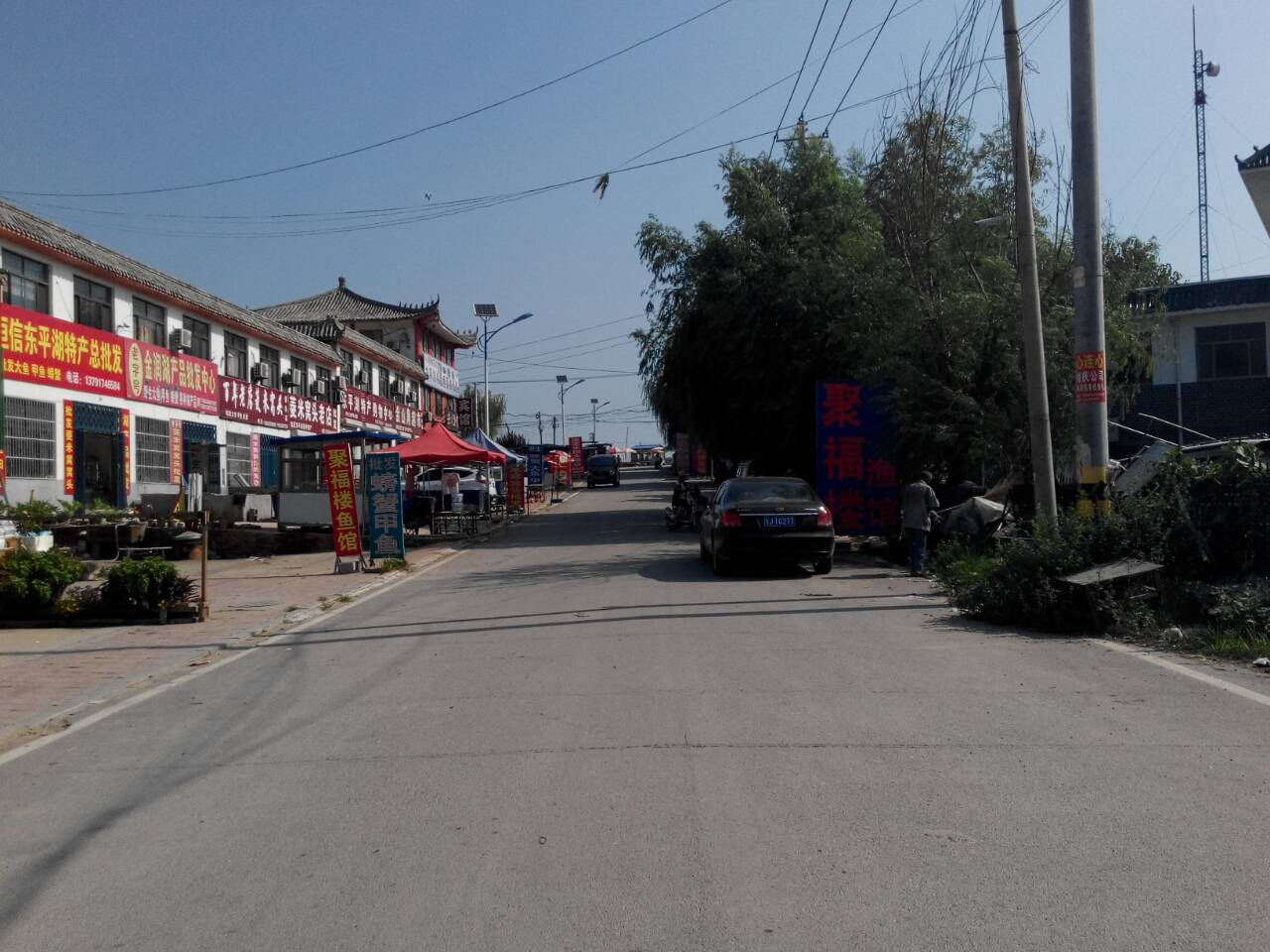
- Da'anshan Village.

- Location in Shandong
- Coordinates: 35°55′06″N 116°05′38″E
- Country: China
- Province: Shandong
- Prefecture: Tai'an
- County: Dongping County

Area
  - Total: 99.43 km^{2} (38.39 sq mi)

Population (2016)
  - Total: 34,700
  - Density: 349/km^{2} (904/sq mi)
- Time zone: UTC+8 (China Standard)
- Postal code: 271515
- Area code: 0538

Shanglaozhuang Township (Chinese: 商老庄乡) is a rural township in Dongping County, Shandong, China. As of the 2016 census it had a population of 34,700 and an area of 99.43-square-kilometre (38.39 sq mi). It borders Yinshan Town in the north, the towns of Xinhu and Laohu in the east, Xiao'anshan Town in the south, and Daimiao Town in the west.

== Administrative division ==
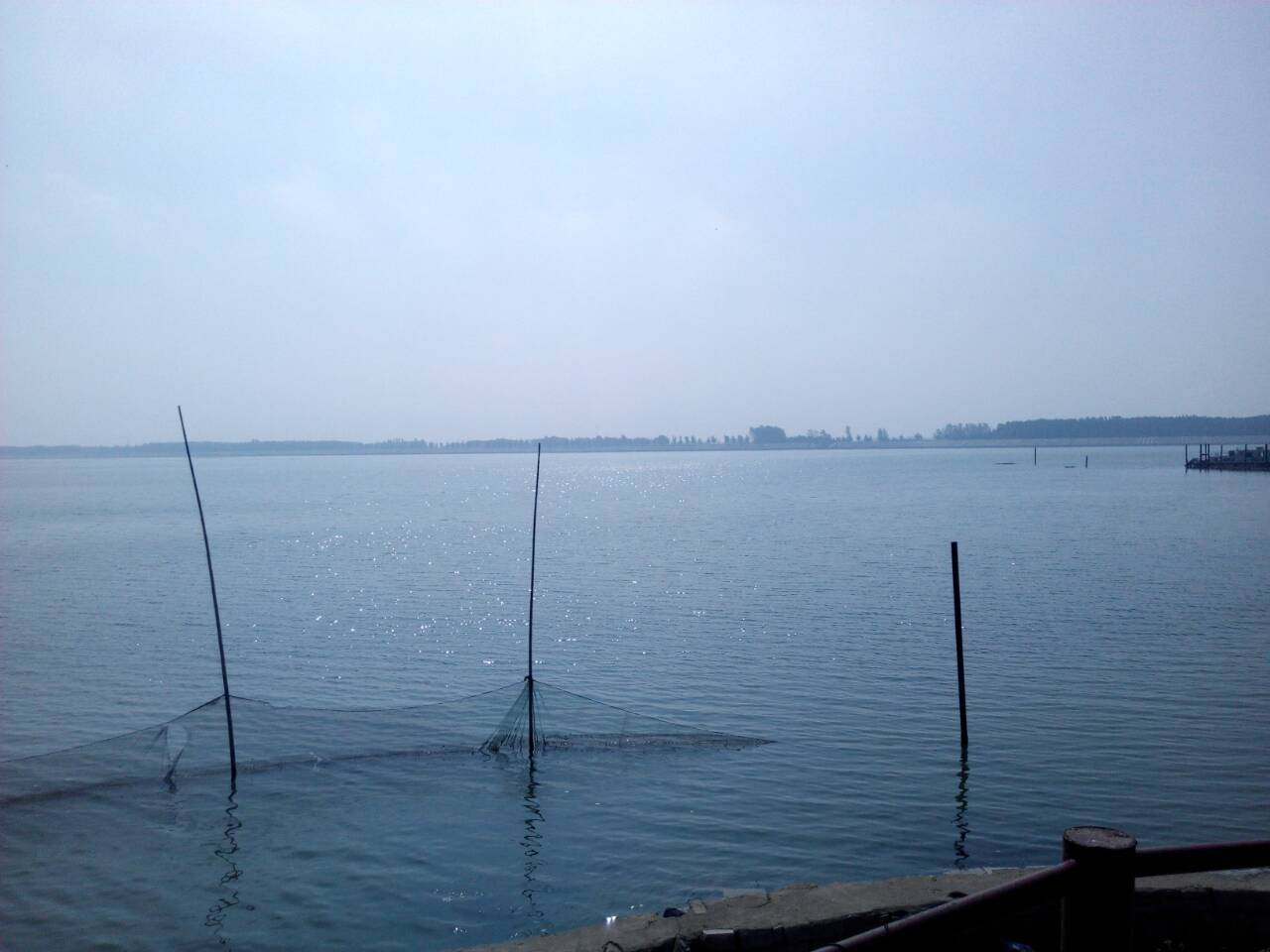
The Dongping Lake.

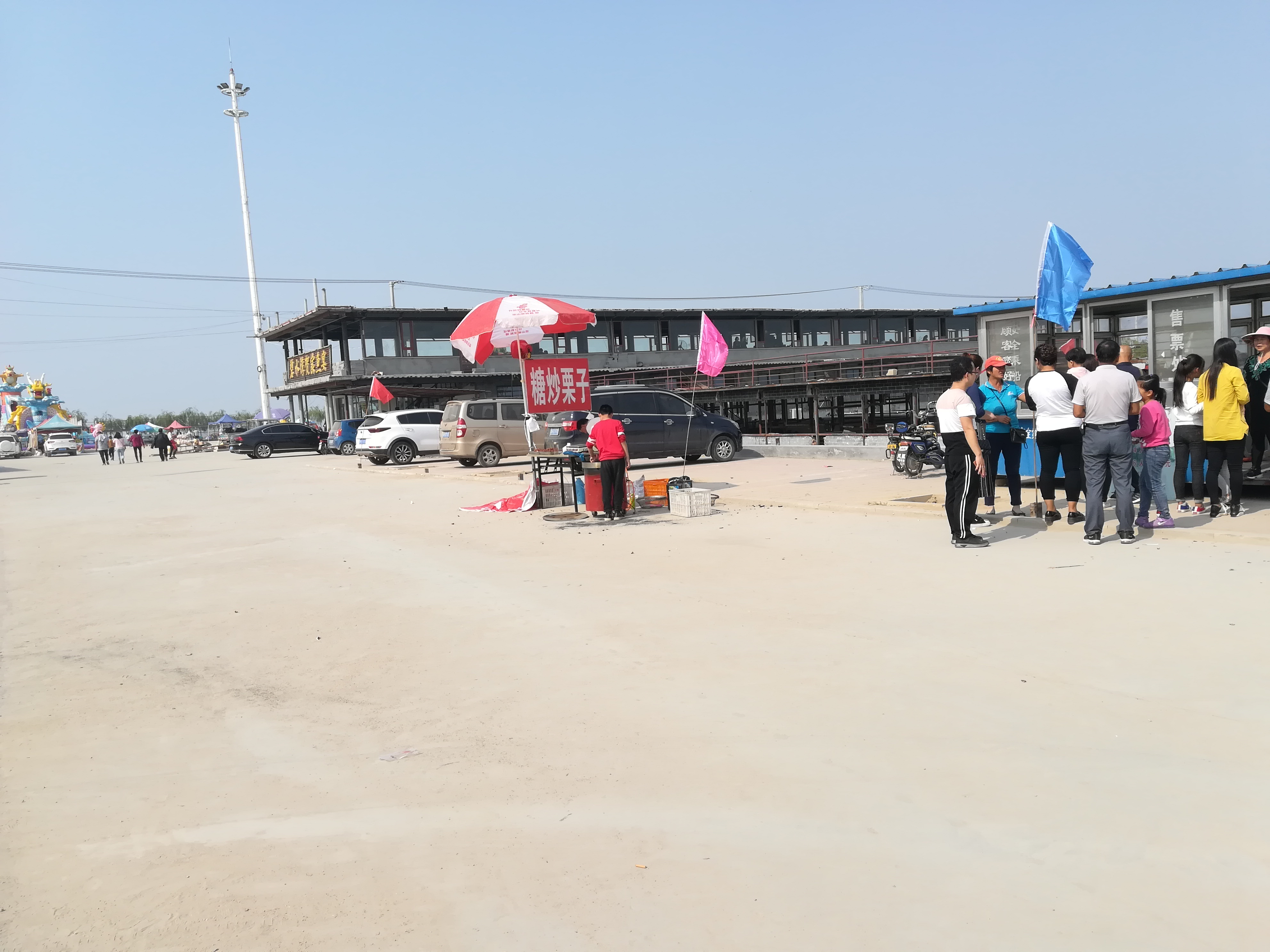
The Da'anshan Wharf.

As of December 2016, the township is divided into 35 villages:

- Shanglaozhuang (商老庄村)
- Dongmiao (董庙村)
- Dongxinzhuang (董辛庄村)
- Chongnali (宠那里村)
- Zhangwenyuan (张文远村)
- Liuli (刘立村)
- Shanglou (商楼村)
- Liqiao (李桥村)
- Zhaozhuang (赵庄村)
- Yihezhuang (义和庄村)
- Liuwanzhuang (刘万庄村)
- Beilizhuang (北李庄村)
- Qinlou (秦楼村)
- Guanchang (官场村)
- Yuwangzhuang (于王庄村)
- Yuanzhuang (袁庄村)
- Dingsha (丁沙村)
- Donglizhuang (东李庄村)
- Songzhuang (宋庄村)
- Gongzhuang (巩庄村)
- Xiaowu (小吴村)
- Jingzhuang (井庄村)
- Yuzhuang (于庄村)
- Tankengya (潭坑涯村)
- Tianzhuang (田庄村)
- Sunzhuang (孙庄村)
- Da'anshan (大安山村)
- Xinguang (新光村)
- Panmengyu (潘孟于村)
- Xincun (新村)
- Baliwan (八里湾村)
- Yihedi (义和堤村)
- Shendikou (沈堤口村)
- Sanlizhuang (三里庄村)
- Xuezhuang (薛庄村)

== History ==
In the Tang dynasty (618–907) and Song dynasty (960–1279), it came under the jurisdiction of Yunzhou and Dongpingfu (东平府; 'Dongping Prefecture'), respectively.

In the Yuan dynasty (1271–1368), Anshan Town (today's Da'anshan Village) became an important ferry, and the area belonged to Dongpingzhou (东平州).

In the Zhengde period (1506–1521) of the Ming dynasty (1368–1644), the name of Shanglaozhuang came from the fact that the people surnamed "Shang" moved to today's Shanglaozhuang Village.

In late Qing dynasty (1644–1911) and early Republic of China (1912-1949), it was under the jurisdiction of the 9th District of Dongping (东平九区).

In August 1940, the Chinese Communist Party set it up as Kunshan Experimental Area (昆山实验区), and then changed it into Kunshan County (昆山县). On August 25, 1949, Kunshan County was renamed "Liangshan County" (梁山县).

In 1984, Shanglaozhuang Township and Da'anshan Township were set up, which belonged to Xiao'anshan District (小安山区).

In December 1985, Shanglaozhuang Township and Da'anshan Township came under the jurisdiction of Dongping County.

In February 2001, former Da'anshan Township was merged into Shanglaozhuang Township.

== Geography ==
Shanglaozhuang Township is slightly higher in the west and slightly lower in the east, and its overall terrain is very low. In 2003, its plain and waterlogging depression topography accounted for 53.2% and 46.8% respectively.

The Dongping Lake is a lake and the largest body of water in the township.

The Daima River (Chinese: 戴码河), Liuchang River (Chinese: 柳长河), Beijing-Hangzhou Grand Canal and the Eastern Route of South-to-North Water Transfer Project are flow through the township.

== Economy ==
The local economy is primarily based upon agriculture and local industry. Fungus is an important cash crop in the region. It mainly produces Auricularia auricula-judae and Tremella fuciformis. The aquaculture owners mainly produce more than 100 kinds of aquatic products, such as lotus root, scutellaria, turtle, fish, crayfish and crab. Meat and eggs are also sources of income for the local economy.

== Education ==
In 2003, there were two middle schools, seven primary schools and five kindergartens in Shanglaozhuang Township.

== Transportation ==
The Da'anshan Wharf serves the township.

The Provincial Highway S331 passes across the township east to west.

The National Highway G220 runs north to south through the western township.
