= Juntan Reservoir =

- Jiuxian Lake
- 军潭水库 (Chinese)
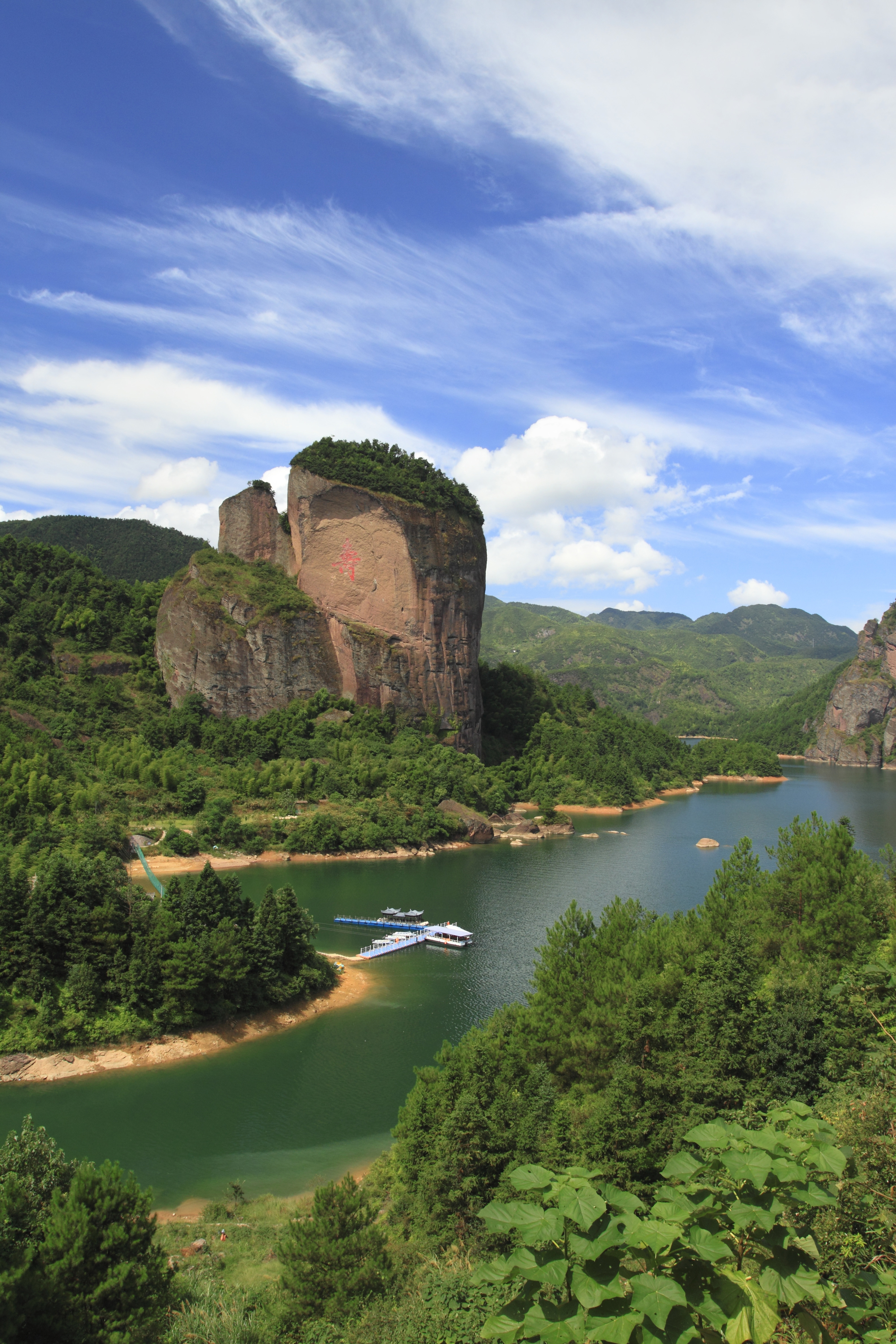
- Juntan Reservoir in 2010.

- Location within China
- Location: Guangfeng District, Shangrao, Jiangxi, China
- Coordinates: 28°15′15″N 118°16′26″E
- Type: Reservoir
- Basin countries: China
- Built: 1960s
- First flooded: 1960s
- Surface area: 350 square kilometres (86,000 acres)
- Average depth: 60 m (200 ft)
- Water volume: 52,700,000 m^{3} (0.0126 cu mi)

Juntan Reservoir (simplified Chinese: 军潭水库; traditional Chinese: 軍潭水庫; pinyin: Jūntán Shuǐkù), also known as Jiuxian Lake (Chinese: 九仙湖; pinyin: Jiǔxiān Hú), is a vast reservoir in Guangfeng District of Shangrao, Jiangxi, China. It is one of the largest man-made lakes in Shangrao city.

It covers a total surface area of 350 km^{2} (140 sq mi) and has a storage capacity of some 52,700,000 m^{3} (0.0126 cu mi) of water.

== Function ==
The reservoir provides drinking water, hydroelectric power and water for irrigation and recreational activities.

== Dam ==
The dam is a gravity dam 68.8 metres (226 ft) high, 218 metres (715 ft) long, and 4 metres (13 ft) thick.
