= Dongping dialect =

Mandarin Chinese dialect of Shandong, China

- 东平话
- Native to: Urban Dongping County in the People's Republic of China
- Region: China
- Native speakers: (undated figure of 760,000)
- Language family: Sino-Tibetan: Sinitic; Chinese; Mandarin; Central Plains; Yan-He region; Dongping dialect

Language codes
- ISO 639-3: –
- Glottolog: None

Dongping dialect The meaning of this sentence is "Wikipedia, the free encyclopedia"

The Dongping dialect (simplified Chinese: 东平话; traditional Chinese: 東平話; pinyin: Dōngpínghuà) is a Mandarin Chinese dialect spoken in Dongping County in Shandong province, China.

== Tones ==
| Tone name | yin ping (陰平) | yang ping (陽平) | shang sheng (上聲) | qu sheng (去聲) |
|---|---|---|---|---|
| Tone contour | 14˩˦ | 53˥˧ | 55˥ | 312˧˩˨ |
| Tone contour Before qingsheng | 312˧˩˨ | 55˥ | 14˩˦ | 53˥˧ |

== Vocabulary ==
| Person | First person | | Second person |
|---|---|---|---|
| Odd number | 我/俺 | | 你/恁 |
| Negative number | Include interlocutors | 咱 | 恁 |
| Negative number | Does not include interlocutors | 俺 | 恁 |

| Dongping dialect | | Standard Chinese | English |
| word dialect | pinyin | Standard Chinese | English |
|---|---|---|---|
| 何 | he | ...的时候 | when |
| 般 | bán | ...一样... | as ... as |
| 些 | xié | 很 | very |
| 就儿 | jiù er | 顺便 | |
| 孬 | náo | 不好 | bad |
| 笏 | hú | (以板击打) | |
| 告底儿 | gǎo dīr | 最终 | eventually |
| 前儿 | qiè er | 前天 | the day before yesterday |
| 夜儿 | yè er | 昨天 | yesterday |
| 今儿 | jǐ mēnr | 今天 | today |
| 明儿 | mià er | 明天 | tomorrow |
| 清起来 | qíng qī lai | 早晨/早上 | |
| 头晌午 | tòu sháng wu | 上午 | |
| 晌午 | sháng wu | 中午 | noon |
| 过晌午 | guǒ sháng wu | 下午 | afternoon |
| 傍黑儿 | báng héir | 傍晚 | nightfall |
| 后晌 | hòng hang | 晚上 | night |
| 嬢 | niǎ | 妈妈 | mom/mather |
| 大大 | dāda | 爸爸 | pappy/father |
| 醭 | bù | 霉 | mold |
| 腚 | dǐng | 屁股 | butt |
