= Dongping County =

Dongping County 东平县
- County
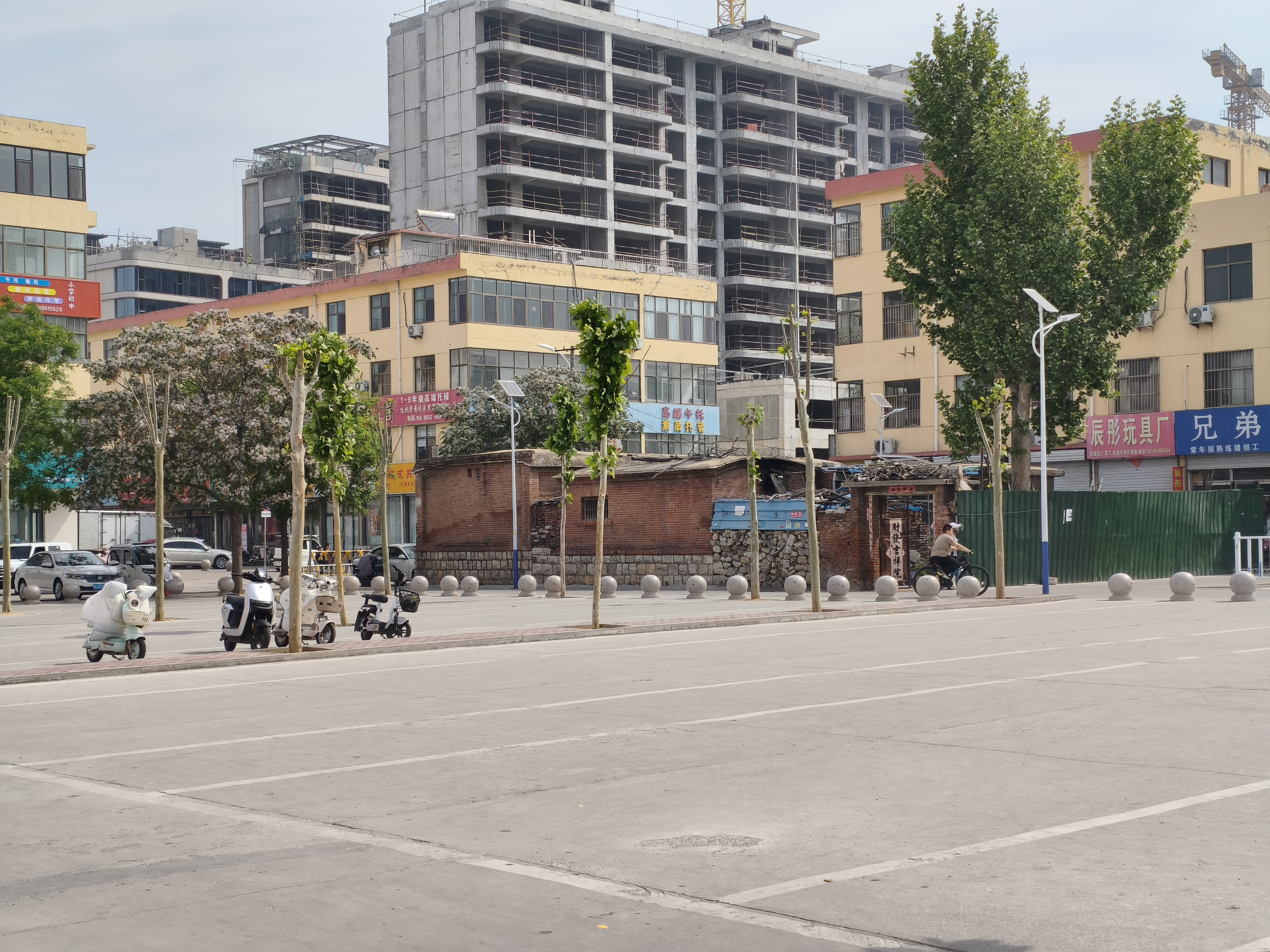
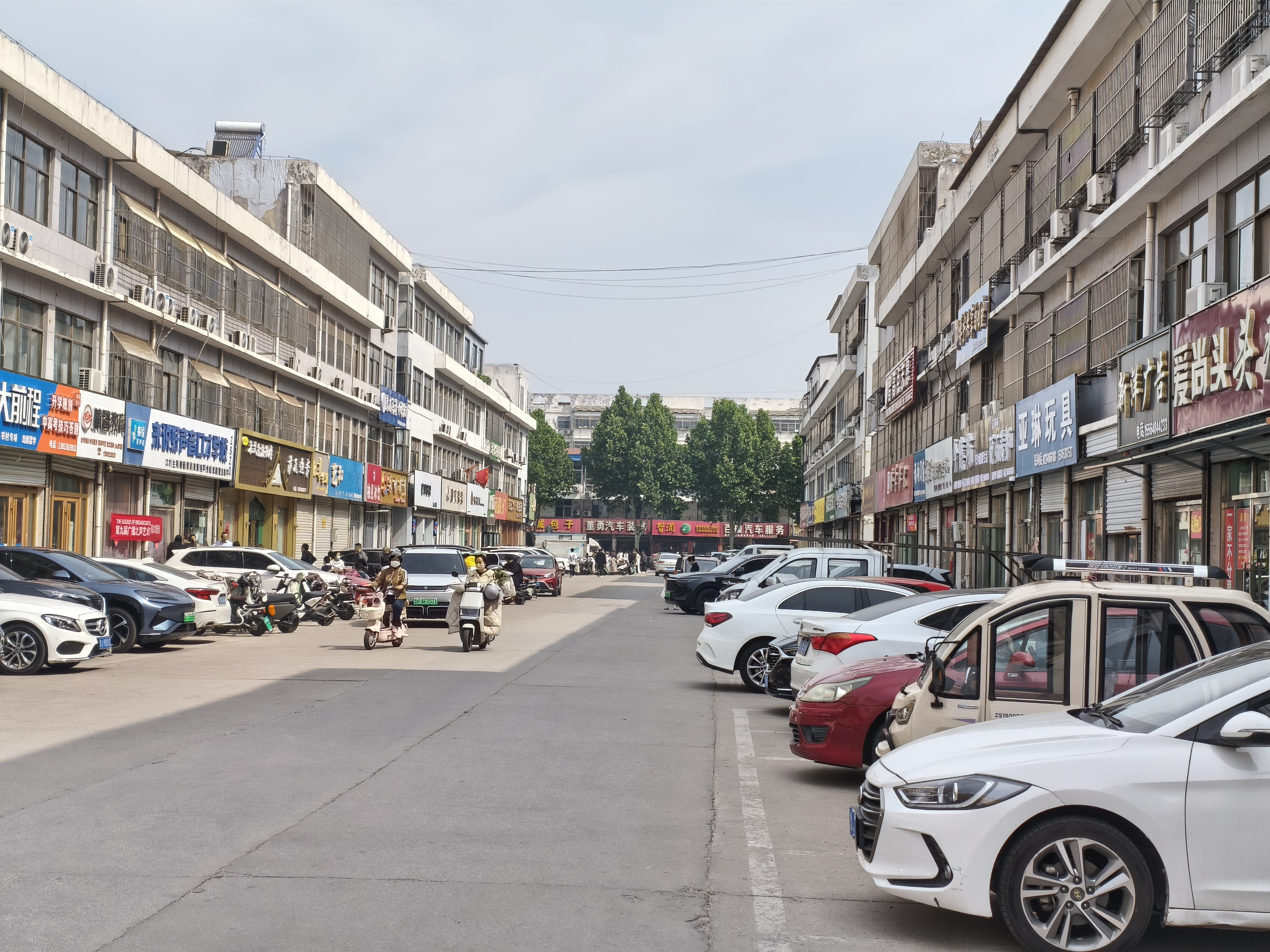
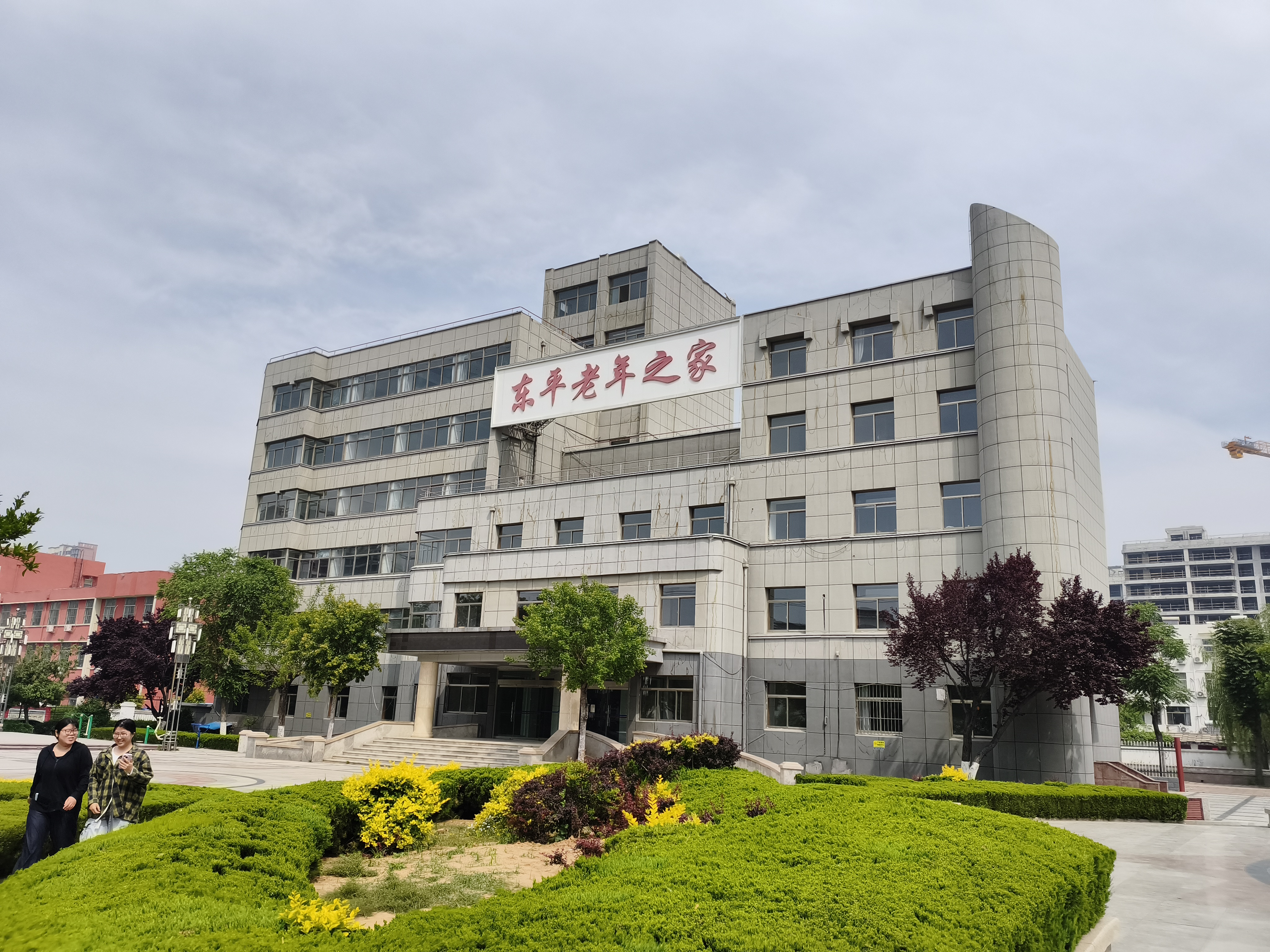
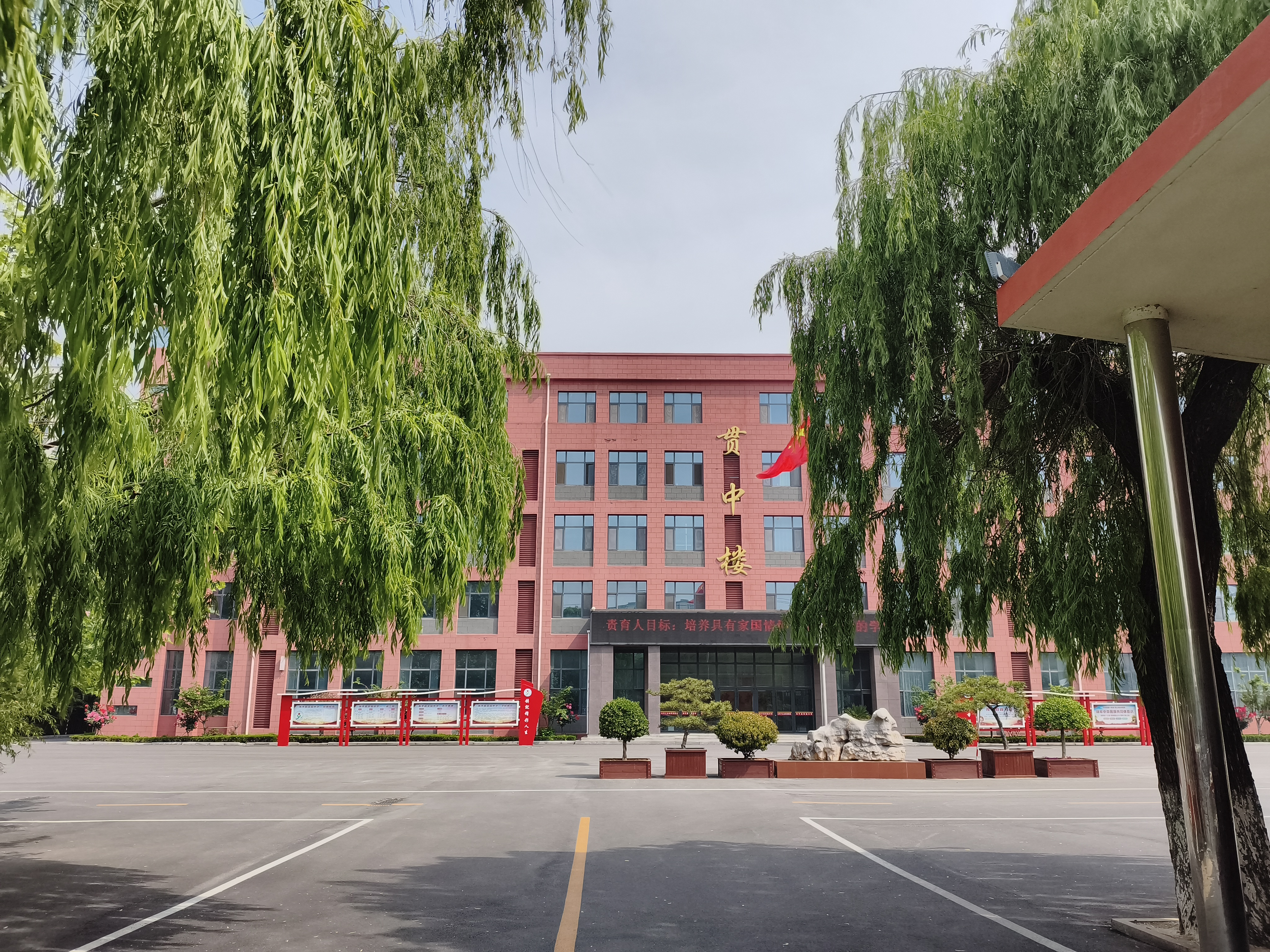
- Streetscape near Dongping Experimental Middle School Streetscape near Dongping Experimental Middle School (alternate view) Dongping County Elderly Home Guanzhong Building, Dongping Experimental Middle School

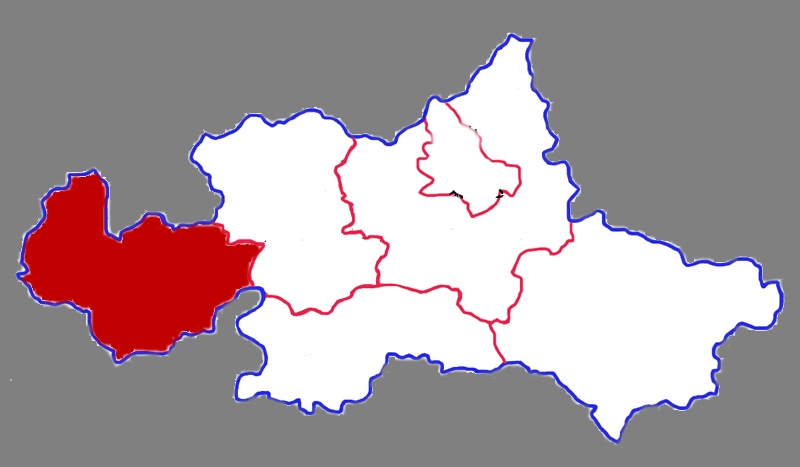
- Location in Tai'an

- Location of the seat in Shandong
- Coordinates: 35.937°N 116.470°E
- Country: People's Republic of China
- Province: Shandong
- Prefecture-level city: Tai'an
- Seat: 35°54′30″N 116°18′00″E

Area
  - Total: 1,339 km^{2} (517 sq mi)

Population (2019)
  - Total: 761,500
  - Density: 568.7/km^{2} (1,473/sq mi)
- Time zone: UTC+8 (China Standard)
- Postal Code: 271500
- Area code: 0538
- Website: www.dongping.gov.cn

Dongping County (simplified Chinese: 东平县; traditional Chinese: 東平縣; pinyin: Dōngpíng Xiàn; lit. 'eastern peace') is a county in the southwestern part of Tai'an, which is located in the west of Shandong Province, China.

In 2007 a remarkable series of well-preserved frescoes dating to the Western Han Period (206 BC - 25 AD) was discovered in a tomb as construction workers were excavating for a planned shopping mall. The frescoes show, among other things, one of the earliest pictorial representations of Confucius meeting Laozi.

== History ==
This region is home to many Buddhist temples and some remarkable Buddhist inscriptions, originally texts were carved during the Northern Qi, but in the eleventh century these were carved over with pictorial images of Buddhas.

In 1438, migrating Hui people introduced Islam to Dongping County. During the reign of the Wanli Emperor, the Zhoucheng Mosque was built.

During the Cultural Revolution in Dongping County, religious activities were prohibited. Mosques were destroyed, imams were expelled, and the Quran was burned. The practice of Islam in the county was resumed in 1979.

The Shandong provincial government and the Dongping County government allocated special funding to restore Zhoucheng Mosque in 1997, and again in 2001.

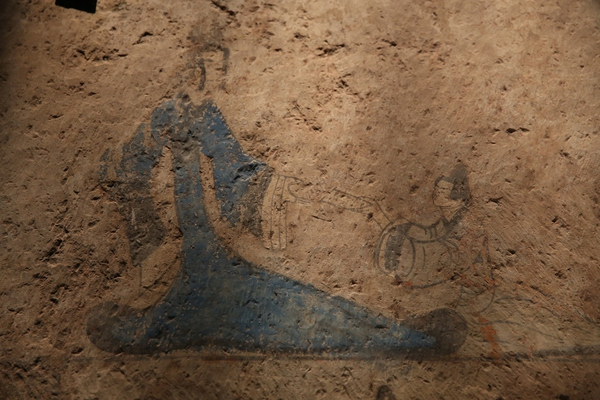
Fresco showing Queen Mother of the West

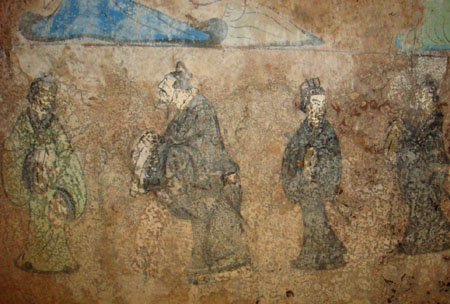
Fresco showing Confucius and Laozi meeting

== Administration ==
As of 2020, this county is divided to 3 subdistricts, 9 towns and 2 townships.

Subdistricts

- Dongping Subdistrict (东平街道)
- Zhoucheng Subdistrict (州城街道)
- Pengji Subdistrict (彭集街道)

Towns

- Jieshan (接山镇)
- Shahezhan (沙河站镇)
- Yinshan (银山镇)
- Laohu (老湖镇)
- Banjiudian (斑鸠店镇)
- Dayang (大羊镇)
- Timen (梯门镇)
- Xinhu (新湖镇)
- Daimiao (戴庙镇)

Townships

- Shanglaozhuang Township (商老庄乡)
- Jiuxian Township (旧县乡)
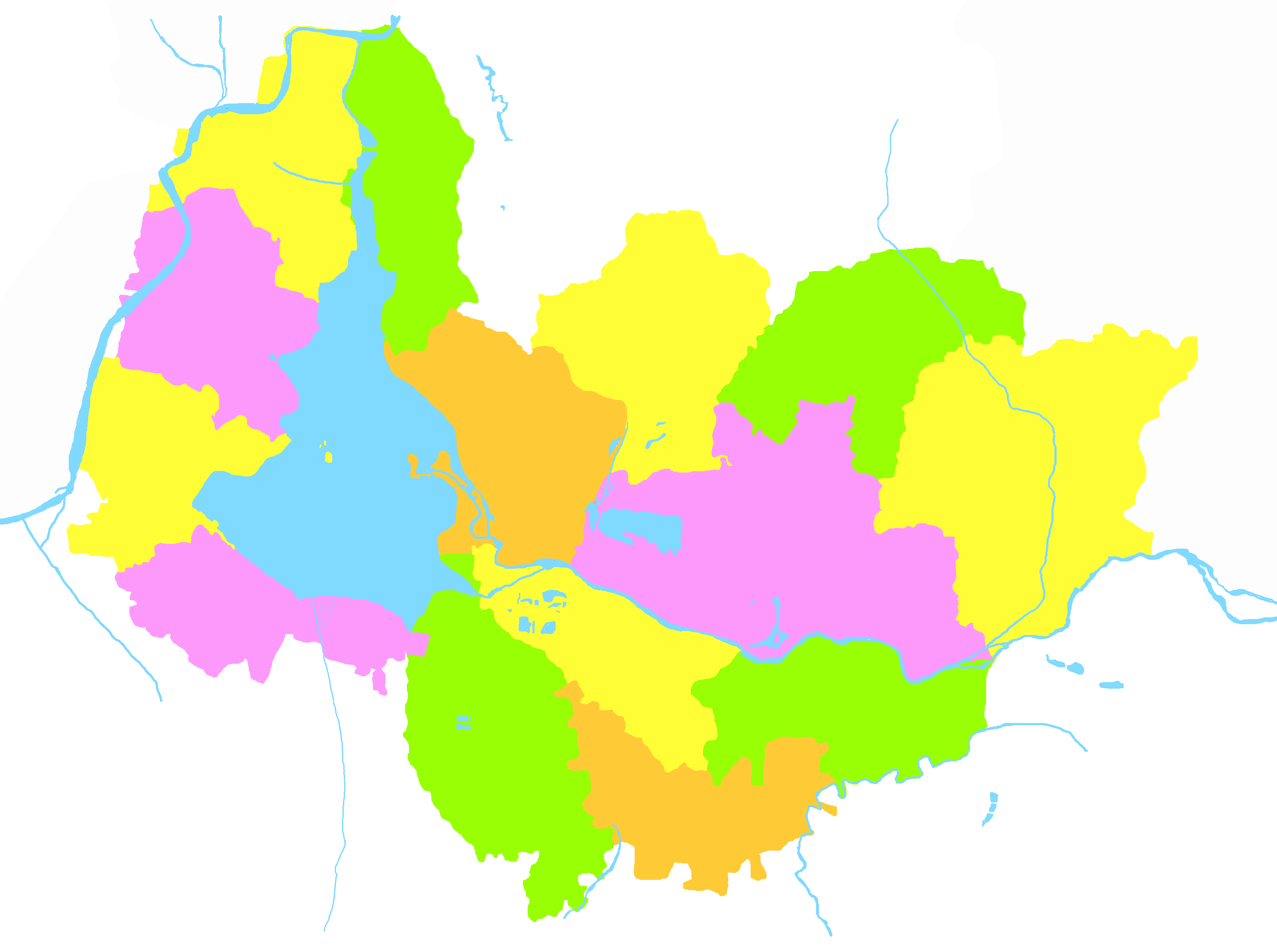

== Demographics ==
In 2016, Dongping County had a permanent population of about 762,100 people, of which, 41.35% lived in urban areas.

=== Vital statistics ===
As of 2016, Dongping County had a birth rate of 14.9 per thousand, and a death rate of 5.0 per thousand, giving the county a rate of natural increase of 9.9 per thousand.

=== Ethnic groups ===
Most of the county's population is ethnically Han Chinese, however, Dongping County is home to 18 ethnic minorities, comprising about 4,300 people. The largest ethnic minority is the Hui people, who number about 4,100 as of 2016. Other ethnic minorities in the county include the Mongolian, Tibetan, Miao, Dong, Bai, Tujia, Hani, Dai, Lisu, Li, Jingpo, Yi, Zhuang, Buyi, Korean, Manchu, and Wa peoples. With the exception of the Hui people, many of Dongping County's ethnic minorities recently moved to the county for work, marriage, or other regions, and are not concentrated in any particular place within the county. The county has four designated ethnic villages: Beimazhuang Village (Chinese: 北马庄村) in Dongping Subdistrict, Xiwangzhuang Village (Chinese: 西王庄村) in Xinhu, Zhanzhuang Village (Chinese: 展庄村) in Laohu, and Beimen Village (Chinese: 北门村) in Zhoucheng Subdistrict.

==== Hui people ====
Unlike the other minorities in Dongping County, the Hui people are concentrated within certain areas within the county. Large concentrations of Hui people can be found in Laohu, Zhoucheng Subdistrict, and Dongping Subdistrict. Smaller concentrations can be found within Timen, Xinhu, Daimiao, Dayang, and Shanglaozhuang Township.

== Culture ==
=== Language ===
The Dongping dialect, a dialect of Mandarin Chinese, is spoken widely throughout the county. In some southern portions of the county, as well as regions surrounding Dongping Lake, retroflexes are dropped, resulting in certain characters with different pronunciations in Standard Mandarin (such as Chinese: 四; pinyin: sì and Chinese: 十; pinyin: shí) being pronounced similarly. Some areas in the southeast and north of the county also employ erhua.

=== Religion ===
As of 2021, Dongping County is home to 19 religious venues approved by the county government, representing 5 different faith groups: Catholicism, Protestantism, Islam, Daoism, and Buddhism. These venues include the Zhoucheng Mosque and the Daoist site of La Mountain.

== Climate ==
Climate data for Dongping, elevation 44 m (144 ft), (1991–2020 normals, extremes 1981–2010)
| Month | Jan | Feb | Mar | Apr | May | Jun | Jul | Aug | Sep | Oct | Nov | Dec | Year |
|---|---|---|---|---|---|---|---|---|---|---|---|---|---|
| Record high °C (°F) | 16.0 (60.8) | 22.1 (71.8) | 28.2 (82.8) | 32.1 (89.8) | 35.7 (96.3) | 41.2 (106.2) | 40.5 (104.9) | 36.0 (96.8) | 36.6 (97.9) | 34.3 (93.7) | 28.3 (82.9) | 18.5 (65.3) | 41.2 (106.2) |
| Mean daily maximum °C (°F) | 4.7 (40.5) | 8.6 (47.5) | 14.7 (58.5) | 21.1 (70.0) | 26.5 (79.7) | 31.5 (88.7) | 31.8 (89.2) | 30.5 (86.9) | 27.1 (80.8) | 21.3 (70.3) | 13.0 (55.4) | 6.3 (43.3) | 19.8 (67.6) |
| Daily mean °C (°F) | −0.4 (31.3) | 3.1 (37.6) | 8.9 (48.0) | 15.2 (59.4) | 20.8 (69.4) | 25.8 (78.4) | 27.3 (81.1) | 26.0 (78.8) | 21.5 (70.7) | 15.3 (59.5) | 7.7 (45.9) | 1.4 (34.5) | 14.4 (57.9) |
| Mean daily minimum °C (°F) | −4.3 (24.3) | −1.3 (29.7) | 4.0 (39.2) | 10.0 (50.0) | 15.6 (60.1) | 20.8 (69.4) | 23.6 (74.5) | 22.4 (72.3) | 17.1 (62.8) | 10.6 (51.1) | 3.5 (38.3) | −2.4 (27.7) | 10.0 (49.9) |
| Record low °C (°F) | −16.5 (2.3) | −15.7 (3.7) | −10.5 (13.1) | −3.0 (26.6) | 2.3 (36.1) | 10.5 (50.9) | 16.3 (61.3) | 13.5 (56.3) | 5.7 (42.3) | −2.0 (28.4) | −12.1 (10.2) | −13.7 (7.3) | −16.5 (2.3) |
| Average precipitation mm (inches) | 5.3 (0.21) | 10.1 (0.40) | 12.3 (0.48) | 31.2 (1.23) | 52.5 (2.07) | 75.8 (2.98) | 169.2 (6.66) | 143 (5.6) | 56.2 (2.21) | 31.0 (1.22) | 25.4 (1.00) | 7.5 (0.30) | 619.5 (24.36) |
| Average precipitation days (≥ 0.1 mm) | 2.1 | 3.4 | 3.1 | 4.9 | 6.3 | 7.7 | 10.5 | 10.3 | 7.3 | 5.3 | 4.5 | 2.7 | 68.1 |
| Average snowy days | 2.2 | 2.3 | 0.6 | 0.2 | 0 | 0 | 0 | 0 | 0 | 0 | 0.7 | 1.8 | 7.8 |
| Average relative humidity (%) | 60 | 56 | 54 | 61 | 64 | 63 | 78 | 81 | 75 | 68 | 67 | 64 | 66 |
| Mean monthly sunshine hours | 152.3 | 153.4 | 203.0 | 224.5 | 246.5 | 215.9 | 194.3 | 193.2 | 184.3 | 182.2 | 157.2 | 147.8 | 2,254.6 |
| Percentage possible sunshine | 49 | 50 | 55 | 57 | 56 | 50 | 44 | 47 | 50 | 53 | 52 | 49 | 51 |
Source: China Meteorological Administration

== Notable people ==
- Zhongli Chun, Qi consort from Wuyan Village
- Suoluhui, Red Eyebrows commander
- Liu Zhen, Han dynasty scholar and writer
- An Daoyi, Northern Qi monk and calligrapher
- Cheng Yaojin, Tang dynasty general
- He Ning, Five Dynasties and Ten Kingdoms period official
- Liang Hao and Liang Gu, Song dynasty father and son zhuangyuan
- Liang Kai, Song dynasty painter
- Qian Yi, Song dynasty pediatrician
- Wang Zhen, Yuan dynasty inventor, engineer, writer, and politician
- Gao Wenxiu, Yuan dynasty dramatist
- Luo Guanzhong (disputed), Yuan dynasty writer
- Du Sance, Ming dynasty politician
- Wang Xian, Ming dynasty scholar
