= Jiuxian Township, Shandong =

Jiuxian Township
- Township

Chinese transcription(s)
  - Simplified: 旧县乡
  - Traditional: 舊縣鄉
  - Pinyin: Jiùxiàn Xiāng
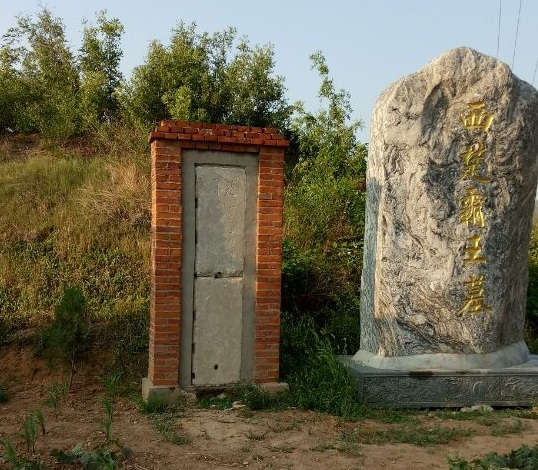
- Tomb of Xiang Yu.

- Location in Shandong
- Coordinates: 36°07′39″N 116°14′19″E
- Country: China
- Province: Shandong
- Prefecture: Tai'an
- County: Dongping County

Area
  - Total: 73 km^{2} (28 sq mi)

Population (2017)
  - Total: 28,000
  - Density: 380/km^{2} (990/sq mi)
- Time zone: UTC+8 (China Standard)
- Postal code: 271517
- Area code: 0538

Jiuxian Township (Chinese: 旧县乡; pinyin: Jiùxiàn Xiāng) is a rural township in Dongping County, Shandong, China. It is surrounded by Hongfanchi Town on the east, Dong'e Town on the north, Dong'e County on the northwest, Banjiudian Town on the west, Dongping Lake on the southwest, and Laohu Town on the south. As of the 2017 census it had a population of 28,000 and an area of 73 square kilometres (28 sq mi).

== Administrative divisions ==
The township is divided into 30 villages: Jiuxian First Village, Jiuxian Second Village, Jiuxian Third Village, Jiuxian Fourth Village, Wanggudian First Village, Wanggudian Second Village, Wanggudian Third Village, Wanggudian Fourth Village, Wanggudian Fifth Village, Dajicheng First Village, Dajicheng Second Village, Dajicheng Third Village, Dajicheng Fourth Village, Dajicheng Fifth Village, Beijicheng Village, Chenshankou Village, Gaoxu Village, Shanwo Village, Fuliang Village, Zhaizi First Village, Zhaizi Second Village, Zhaizi Third Village, Yincun First Village, Yincun Second Village, Yincun Third Village, Jizhuang Village, Jianggou Village, Da'eshan Village, Dong'eshan Village, Tuncunpu Village, Jiuxian Village.

== History ==
During the Spring and Autumn period (771 BC–476 BC) and the Warring States period (475 BC–221 BC), it was the seat of Yangguyi City (Chinese: 阳谷邑城).

In the Qin dynasty (221 BC–206 BC), it belonged to Jibeijun (Chinese: 济北郡).

In 202 B.C., Xiang Yu was defeated by Liu Bang, his head was buried here.

In the Han dynasty (202 BC–220 AD), it was under the jurisdiction of Dongjun (Chinese: 东郡).

In the Northern Wei (386–535), it came under the jurisdiction of Jizhou (Chinese: 济州).

In the Sui dynasty (581–618), it belonged to Jibeijun (Chinese: 济北郡).

In the Tang dynasty (618–907), it came under the jurisdiction of Jizhou (Chinese: 济州).

In the Northern Song dynasty (960–1127), it was under the jurisdiction of Dong'e County (Chinese: 东阿县), and then under the jurisdiction of Dongpingfu (Chinese: 东平府) in the Jin dynasty (1115–1234).

Since Yuan dynasty (1271–1368), it belonged to Dong'e County.

In 1938, one year after the Marco Polo Bridge Incident, it was occupied by the Imperial Japanese Army. Following Japan's surrender, it came under the jurisdiction of Pingyin County.

After the establishment of the Communist State in 1949, it was renamed Jiuxian People's Commune.

In May 1984, Jiuxian People's Commune was revoked and Jiuxian District was established.

On September 20, 1985, Jiuxian District was revoked and Jiuxian Township was established.

On January 23, 1996, it was under the jurisdiction of Dongping County.

== Geography ==
The highest point in the township is Mount Dahong (Chinese: 大红山) which stands 377 metres (1,237 ft) above sea level. The lowest point is Mount Da'e (Chinese: 大鹅山) which at 40 metres (130 ft) above sea level.

Dongping Lake is the largest lake in the township.

Yellow River passes through the township west to east. Xiaoqing River (Chinese: 小清河) flows south to north through the township.

== Economy ==
Sweet potatoes, Vegetables and Fungus are important to the economy.

The principal industries in the area are apparel industry and sweet potato processing industry.

== Transportation ==
National Highway G220 passes across the township.

Provincial Highway S255 is a provincial highway in the township.

== Attractions ==
The main attractions are the Dongping Lake, Shijie Village Film and Television Base (Chinese: 石碣村影视基地), Tomb of Xiang Yu (Chinese: 项羽墓), Site of Jiuxianyi (Chinese: 旧县邑遗址), Site of Yangguyi City (Chinese: 阳谷邑城遗址), Arch of Chastity and Filial Piety of Madame Qin (Chinese: 秦氏节孝坊), Mount Yanggu (Chinese: 阳谷山), and Bixia Ancestral Temple (Chinese: 碧霞祠).

During the ten-year Cultural Revolution, the Tomb of Xiang Yu was completely destroyed by the Red Guards. A 2000-year-old cypress of Han dynasty was cut by the Red Guards.
