= Longqing Gorge =

Scenic area in Beijing, China

Coordinates: 40°33′07″N 116°00′07″E

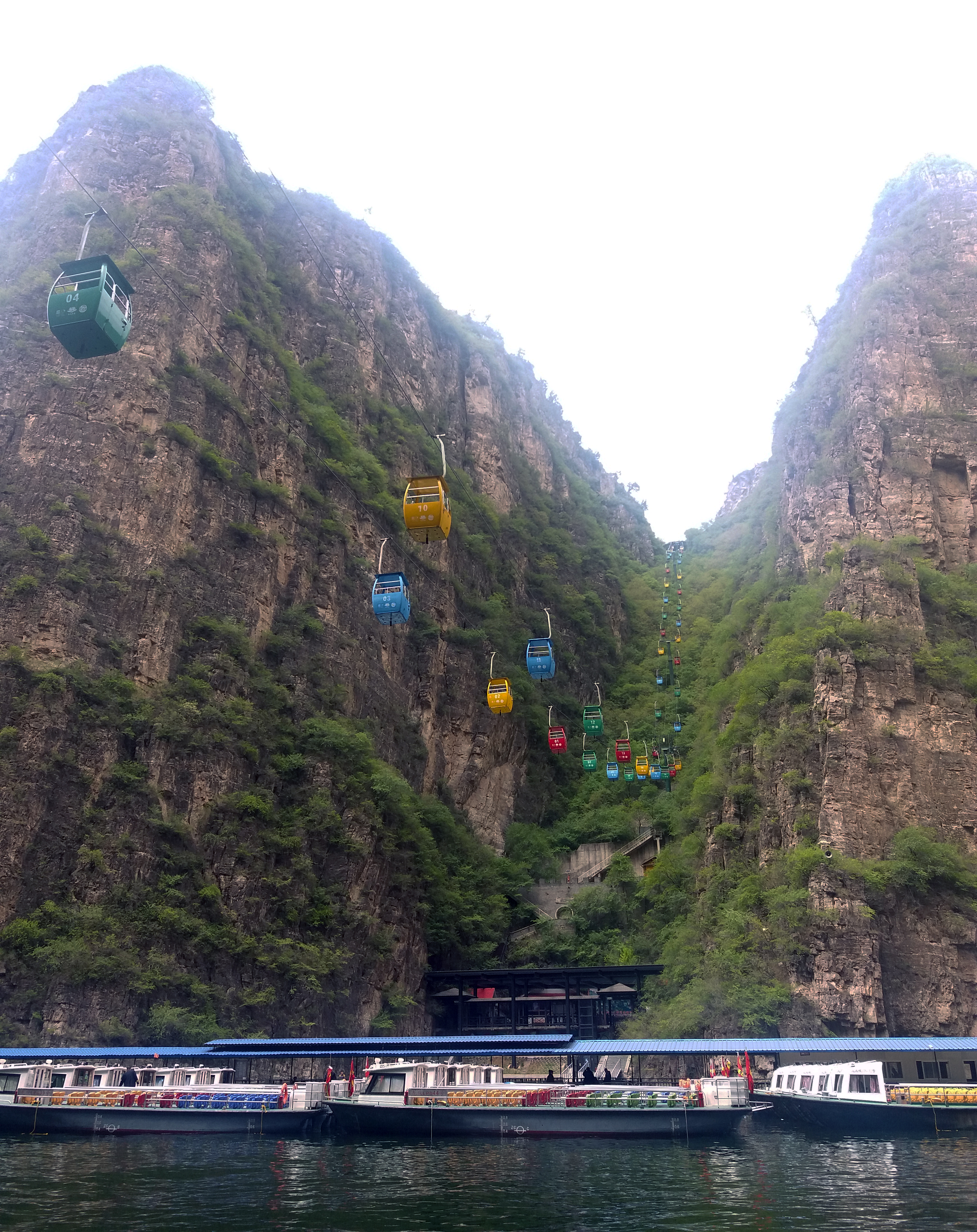
Cable car at Longqing Gorge

Longqing Gorge (simplified Chinese: 龙庆峡; traditional Chinese: 龍慶峽; pinyin: Lóngqìng Xiá) is a scenic area in the village of Gucheng at Yanqing District of Beijing. It is one of the most popular day trip getaways for people living in Beijing.

== Canyon landscape ==
It is well known for its scenic canyon landscape. A reservoir flooded the canyon after the building of the nearby Longqing Dam. The mountain and river vistas are reminiscent of other famous landscapes in China. It is variously given the names "Little Three Gorges" for resembling a "microcosm of the Yangtze River's fabled Three Gorges" or "mini Li River" for its "narrow peaks and dramatic rock faces" recalling the Li River in Guilin.

== Activities ==
The prime attraction for tourists visiting the scenic area is a 15-minute open top boat cruise along the bottom of the Longqing Gorge. A cable car takes visitors up to a mountain peak. The Jingang Temple (Diamond), built in 1065, and Immortal Taoist Template are tiny structures situated at the top of the mountains. Bungee jumping can be done from the top of one of the mountains.

There is a 258-metre (846 ft) yellow dragon-shaped escalator to bring visitors to the top of the Longqing Dam.

== Ice Lantern Festival ==
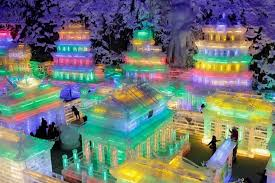
Inside the ice sculpture pavilion during the Ice Lantern Festival

The scenic area has been the site of the Ice Lantern Festival for more than 30 years. During the festival there are around 150 ice sculptures are on display inside an ice pavilion. It is a smaller version of the Harbin International Ice and Snow Sculpture Festival. Starting in 2016, the ice festival has had an Olympics theme to promote the 2022 Winter Olympics in Beijing including a cluster of events hosted in Yanqing District.

== Bibliography ==
- Buckley, Michael (1994) [1st pub. 1984]. China (4th ed.). Franklin, Tennessee: Lonely Planet.
