= Danish dialects =

Linguistics of Denmark

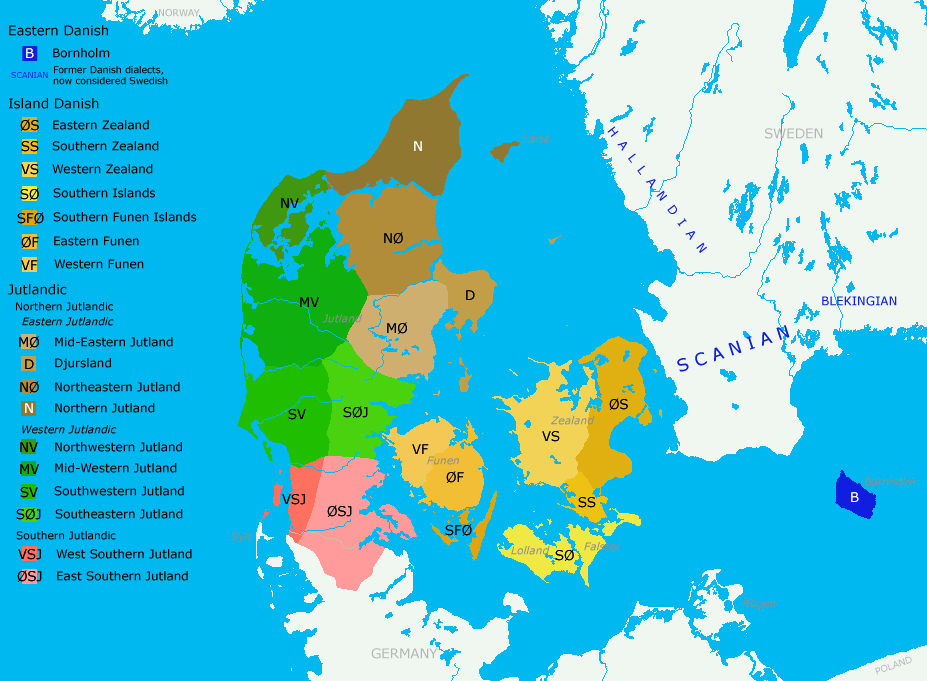
Map of main Danish dialect areas

The Danish language has a number of regional and local dialect varieties. These can be divided into the traditional dialects, which differ from modern Standard Danish in both phonology and grammar, and the Danish accents, which are local varieties of the standard language distinguished mostly by pronunciation and local vocabulary colored by traditional dialects. Traditional dialects are now mostly extinct in Denmark, with only the oldest generations still speaking them.

The traditional dialects are generally divided into three main dialectal areas: Jutlandic dialect, Insular Danish, and East Danish. Since the Swedish conquest of the Eastern Danish provinces Skåne, Halland and Blekinge in 1645/1658, the Eastern Danish dialects there have come under heavy Swedish influence. Many residents now speak regional variants of Standard Swedish. However, many researchers still consider the dialects in Scania, Halland (Hallandsk) and Blekinge (Blekingsk) as part of the East Danish dialect group. The Swedish National Encyclopedia from 1995 classifies Scanian as an Eastern Danish dialect with South Swedish elements. Also Bornholmish belongs to the East Danish dialect group. Jutlandic is divided into Southern Jutlandic and Northern Jutlandic, with Northern Jutlandic subdivided into North Jutlandic and West Jutlandic. Insular Danish is divided into Zealand, Funen, Møn, and Lolland-Falster dialect areas – each with additional internal variation. The variant of Standard Danish spoken in Southern Schleswig is called South Schleswig Danish, the Danish variant on the Faroe Islands Gøtudanskt. Danish shares many similarities with the Norwegian (Bokmål). Also North Frisian and Gutnish (Gutamål) are influenced by Danish.

Jutlandic (Jysk)	Insular Danish (Ømål)	East Danish (Østdansk)	other variants
North Jutlandic (with Eastern and Western Jutlandic)	Zeelandic	Scanian	Southern Schleswig Danish
South Jutlandic (with Angel Danish)	Funen dialect	Blekinge dialect	Gøtudanskt accent
	Møn dialect	Halland dialect	
	Lolland-Falster dialect	Bornholm dialect	

== Stød and tonal accents ==
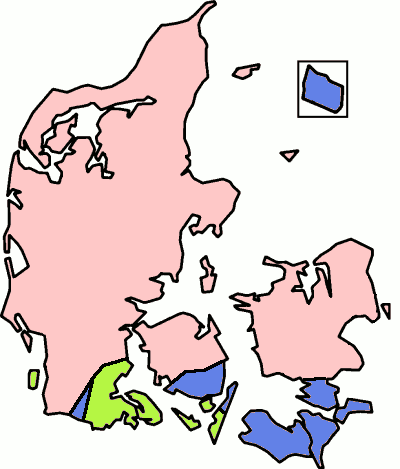
A map showing the distribution of stød in Danish dialects. Dialects in the pink areas have stød, as in Standard Danish. Dialects in the green areas have tones, as in Swedish and Norwegian. Dialects in the blue areas have neither stød nor tones, as in Icelandic, German, and English.

The realization of stød has traditionally been one of the most important isoglosses for classifying geographic dialect areas. There are four main regional variants of stød:

- In Southeastern Jutlandic, Southernmost Funen, Southern Langeland, and Ærø, there is no stød but rather a form of pitch accent.
- South of a line (Stødgrænsen 'the stød boundary') going through central South Jutland and crossing Southern Funen and central Langeland and north of Lolland-Falster, Møn, Southern Zealand, and Bornholm, there is neither stød nor pitch accent.
- In most of Jutland and Zealand, there is stød.
- In Zealandic traditional dialects and regional language, stød is more frequent than in the standard language.

In Zealand, the stød line divides Southern Zealand, without stød, and formerly directly under the Danish crown, from the rest of the island, formerly the property of various noble estates, with stød.

In the dialects with pitch accent, such as the Southern Jutlandic of Als (Synnejysk), stød corresponds to a low level tone, and the non-stød syllable in Standard Danish corresponds to a high rising tone:

Word	Rigsdansk	Synnejysk
dag 'day'	[daˀ]	[dàw]
dage 'days'	[daːə]	[dǎw]

On Zealand, some traditional dialects have a phenomenon called short-vowel stød (kortvokalstød): some monosyllabic words with a short vowel and a coda consonant cluster have stød when the definite suffix follows: præst [pʁæst] 'priest' but præsten [pʁæˀstn̩] 'the priest'.

In Western Jutland, a second stød, more like a preconsonantal glottal stop, occurs in addition to the one of Standard Danish. It occurs in different environments, particularly after stressed vowels before final consonant clusters that arise through the elision of final unstressed vowels. For example, the word trække 'to pull', which is /trække/ in Standard Danish, is [tʁæʔk] in Western Jutlandic. Also, the present tense trækker, which is /trækker/ in Standard Danish, is [tʁæʔkə] in Western Jutlandic.

== Bibliography ==
- Basbøll, Hans (2005). The Phonology of Danish. Oxford University Press. ISBN 978-0-19-824268-0.
- Ejskjær, I. (1990). "Stød and pitch accents in the Danish dialects". Acta Linguistica Hafniensia. 22 (1): 49–75. doi:10.1080/03740463.1990.10411522.
- Kortlandt, F. (2010). Vestjysk stød again. Amsterdamer Beiträge zur Älteren Germanistik. Vol. 66. pp. 29–32. doi:10.1163/18756719-066001004.
- Perridon, H. (2009). How Old is the Vestjysk Stød?. Amsterdamer Beiträge zur Älteren Germanistik. Vol. 65. pp. 5–10. doi:10.1163/9789042032118_003. S2CID 162213417.
- Jespersen, O. (1966). Modersmålets fonetik (in Danish). Schuboth.
- Sørensen, V. (2011). Lyd og prosodi i de klassiske danske dialekter (in Danish). Peter Skautrup Centret.
