= Southern Schleswig Danish =

Danish dialect spoken in Northern Germany

- Region: Southern Schleswig
- Ethnicity: Danish minority in Southern Schleswig
- Language family: Indo-European: Germanic; North Germanic; East Scandinavian; Danish; Southern Schleswig Danish
- Early forms: Old Norse: Old East Norse; Early Old Danish; Late Old Danish
- Writing system: Danish alphabet

Language codes
- ISO 639-3: –
- IETF: da-u-sd-desh

Southern Schleswig Danish (Danish: Sydslesvigdansk, German: Südschleswigdänisch) is a variety of the Danish language spoken in Southern Schleswig in Northern Germany. It is a variety of Standard Danish (rigsmål, rigsdansk) influenced by the surrounding German language in relation to prosody, syntax and morphology, used by the Danish minority in Southern Schleswig.

Originally Southern Jutlandic was spoken in most parts of the area (in the variants of Angel Danish and Mellemslesvigsk). On the western coast, North Frisian was also spoken. After the language shift in the 18th, 19th and 20th centuries, most of the Danish and North Frisian dialects were replaced by Low and Standard German.

Accordingly, there is a Northern Schleswig variety of German language in Northern Schleswig. A similar phenomenon is Gøtudanskt on the Faroe Islands.
