= Danish language =

North Germanic language

Danish
- dansk
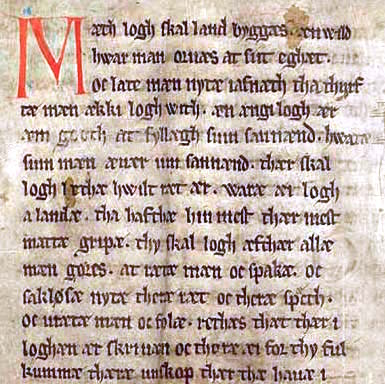
- The first page of the Jutlandic Law originally from 1241 in Codex Holmiensis, copied in 1350. The first sentence is: "Mæth logh skal land byggas" Modern orthography: "Med lov skal land bygges" English translation: 'With law shall a country be built'
- Pronunciation: [ˈtænˀsk]
- Native to: Denmark; Schleswig-Holstein (Germany)
- Region: Denmark, Schleswig-Holstein (Germany); Additionally in the Faroe Islands and Greenland
- Ethnicity: Danes
- Native speakers: 5.5 million (2012)
- Language family: Indo-European: Germanic; Northwest Germanic; North Germanic; East Scandinavian; Danish
- Early forms: Old Norse: Old East Norse; Early Old Danish; Late Old Danish
- Dialects: Jutlandic; Insular; Dano-Faroese; Southern Schleswig; Dano-Norwegian †; Angel †; East Danish; South Jutlandic
- Writing system: Latin (Danish alphabet); Danish Braille

Official status
- Official language in: Kingdom of Denmark: Denmark; Faroe Islands; Nordic Council European Union
- Recognised minority language in: Greenland; Germany
- Regulated by: Dansk Sprognævn (Danish Language Council)

Language codes
- ISO 639-1: da
- ISO 639-2: dan
- ISO 639-3: Either: dan – Insular Danish jut – Jutlandic
- Glottolog: dani1285 Danish juti1236 Jutish
- Linguasphere: 5
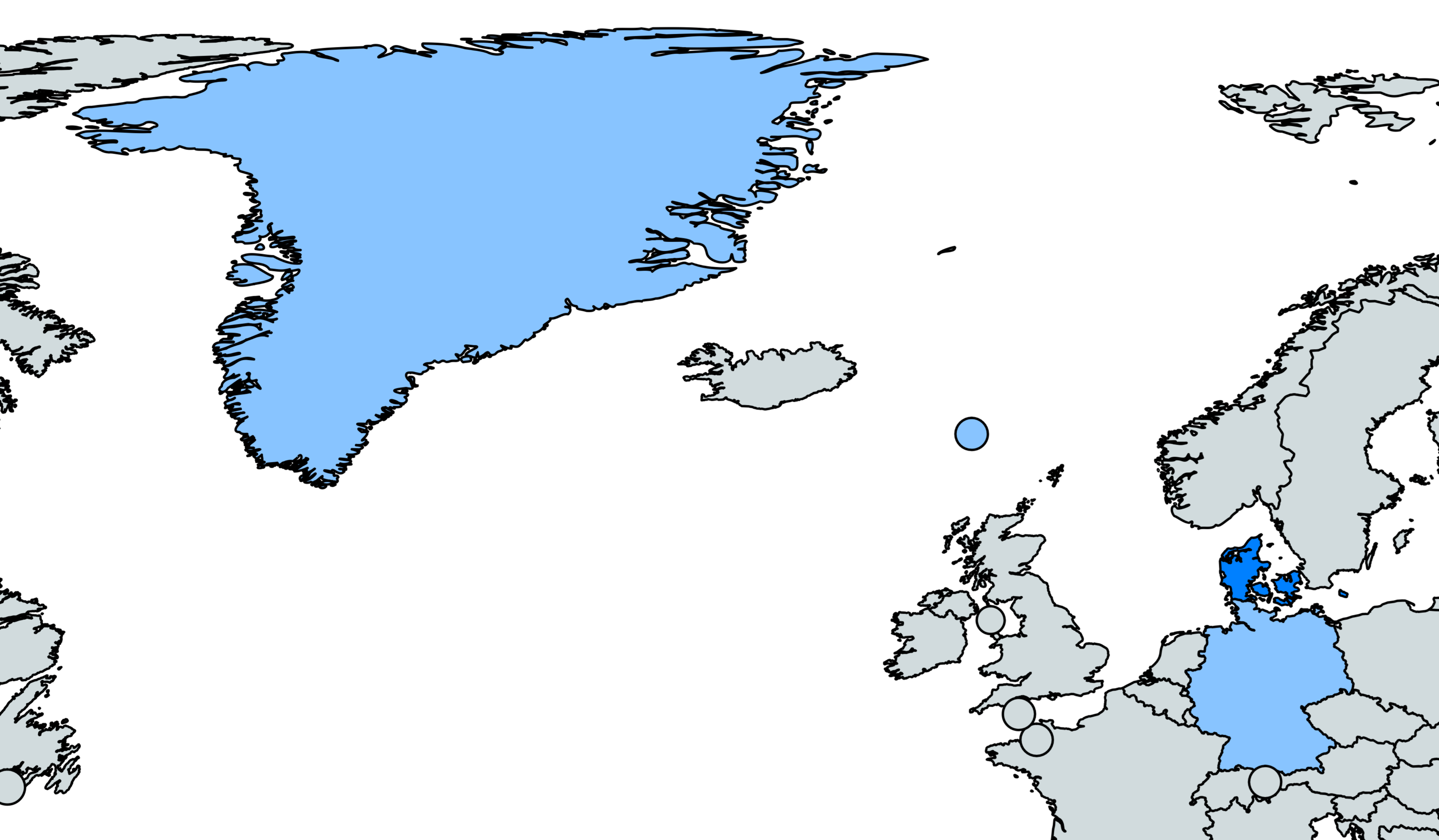
- Spoken by a majority; Spoken by a minority

Danish (endonym: dansk pronounced [ˈtænˀsk], dansk sprog [ˈtænˀsk ˈspʁɔwˀ]) is a North Germanic language from the Indo-European language family spoken by about 5.5 million people, principally in and around Denmark. Communities of Danish speakers are also found in Greenland, the Faroe Islands, Iceland and the northern German region of Southern Schleswig, where it has minority language status. Minor Danish-speaking communities are also found in Norway, Sweden, the United States, Canada, Brazil, and Argentina.

Along with the other North Germanic languages, Danish is a descendant of Old Norse, the common language of the Germanic peoples who lived in Scandinavia during the Viking Era. Danish, together with Swedish, derives from the East Norse dialect group, while the Middle Norwegian language (before the influence of Danish) and Norwegian Nynorsk are classified as West Norse along with Faroese and Icelandic (Norwegian Bokmål may be thought of as mixed Danish-Norwegian, therefore mixed East-West Norse). However, the "mainland (or continental) Scandinavian" languages — modern spoken Danish, Norwegian, and Swedish — are largely mutually intelligible with each other, but not with "insular Scandinavian", i.e. Icelandic and Faroese. Although the written languages are compatible, spoken Danish is distinctly different from Norwegian and Swedish and thus the degree of mutual intelligibility with either varies between regions and speakers.

Until the 16th century, Danish was a continuum of dialects spoken from Southern Jutland and Schleswig to Scania with no standard variety or spelling conventions. With the Protestant Reformation and the introduction of the printing press, a standard language was developed which was based on the dialect of Copenhagen. It spread through use in the education system and administration, though German and Latin continued to be the most important written languages well into the 17th century. Following the loss of territory to Germany and Sweden, a nationalist movement adopted the language as a token of Danish identity, and the language experienced a strong surge in use and popularity, with major works of literature produced in the 18th and 19th centuries. Today, traditional Danish dialects have all but disappeared, though regional variants of the standard language exist. The main differences in language are between generations, with youth language being particularly innovative.

Danish has a very large vowel inventory consisting of 27 phonemically distinctive vowels, and its prosody is characterized by the distinctive phenomenon stød, a kind of laryngeal phonation type. Due to the many pronunciation differences that set Danish apart from its neighboring languages, particularly the vowels, difficult prosody and "weakly" pronounced consonants, it is sometimes considered to be a "difficult language to learn, acquire and understand", and some evidence shows that children are slower to acquire the phonological distinctions of Danish compared with other languages. The grammar is moderately inflective with strong (irregular) and weak (regular) conjugations and inflections. Nouns, adjectives, and demonstrative pronouns distinguish common and neutral gender. Like English, Danish only has remnants of a former case system, particularly in the pronouns. Unlike English, it has lost all person marking on verbs. Its word order is V2, with the finite verb always occupying the second slot in the sentence.

== Classification ==
Danish is a Germanic language of the North Germanic branch. Other names for this group are the Nordic or Scandinavian languages. Along with Swedish, Danish descends from the Eastern dialects of the Old Norse language; Danish and Swedish are also classified as East Scandinavian or East Nordic languages. Scandinavian languages are often considered a dialect continuum, where no sharp dividing lines are seen between the different vernacular languages.

Like Norwegian and Swedish, Danish was significantly influenced by Low German in the Middle Ages, and has been influenced by English since the turn of the 20th century.

Danish itself can be divided into three main dialect areas: Jutlandic (West Danish), Insular Danish (including the standard variety), and East Danish (including Bornholmian and Scanian). According to the view that Scandinavian is a dialect continuum, East Danish can be considered intermediary between Danish and Swedish, while Scanian can be considered a Swedified East Danish dialect, and Bornholmian is its closest relative.

- Proto-Germanic
  - East Germanic languages
  - West Germanic languages
  - Proto-Norse →
    - Old Norse
      - Old West Norse
        - Icelandic
        - Faroese
        - Norwegian
      - Old East Norse
        - Danish
        - Swedish

=== Vocabulary ===
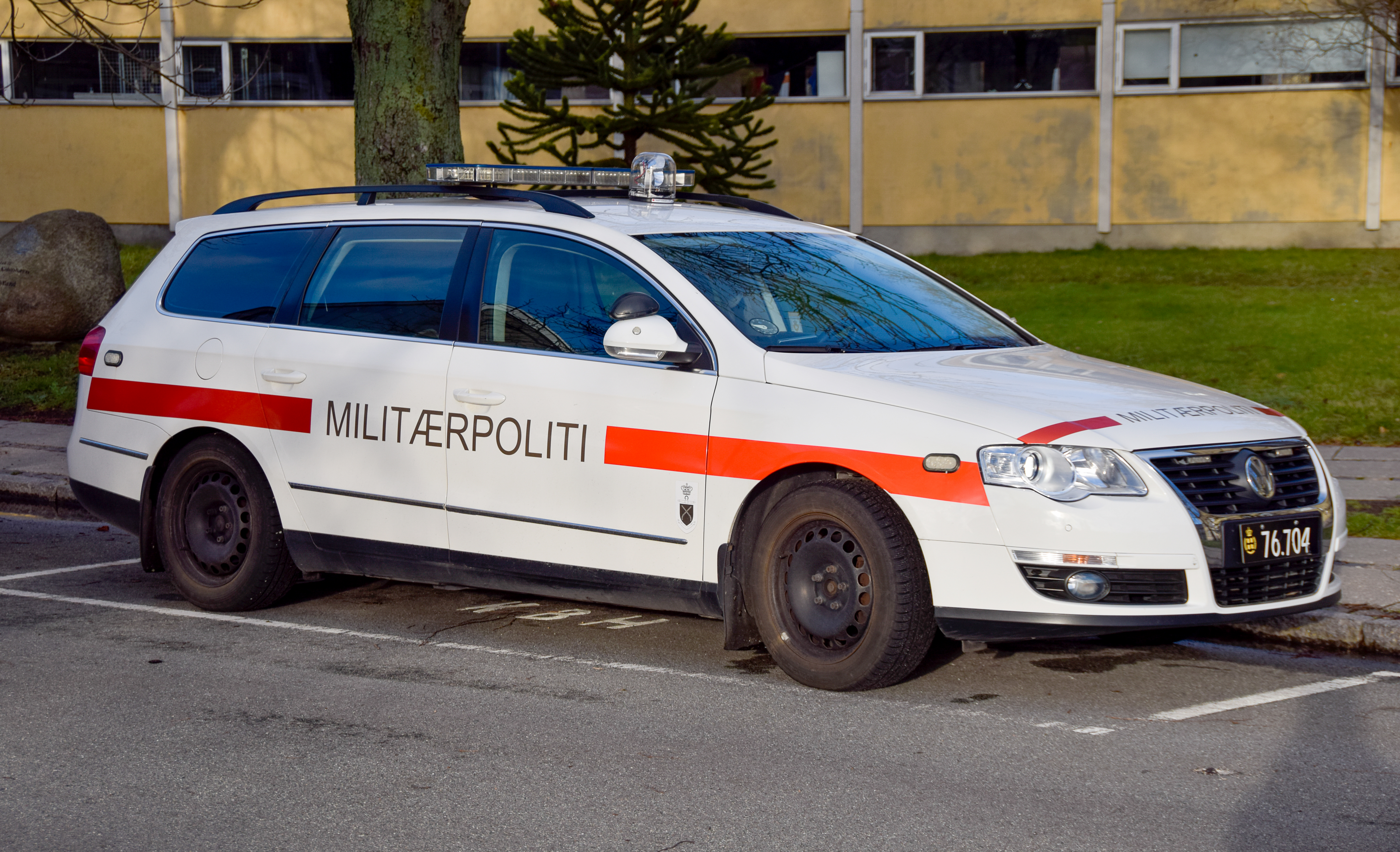
Danish label reading militærpoliti 'military police', on a police vehicle

Approximately 2,000 uncompounded Danish words are derived from Old Norse and ultimately from Proto Indo-European. Of these 2,000, 1,200 are nouns, 500 are verbs and 180 are adjectives. Danish has also absorbed many loanwords, most of which were borrowed from Low German of the Late Middle Ages. Out of the 500 most frequently used Danish words, 100 are loans from Middle Low German; this is because Low German was the second official language of Denmark–Norway. In the 17th and 18th centuries, standard German and French superseded Low German influence, and in the 20th century, English became the main supplier of loanwords, especially after World War II. Although many old Nordic words remain, some were replaced with borrowed synonyms, for example æde 'eat' was mostly supplanted by the Low German spise. As well as loanwords, new words can be freely formed by compounding existing words. In standard texts of contemporary Danish, Middle Low German loans account for about 16–17% of the vocabulary, Graeco-Latin loans 4–8%, French 2–4% and English about 1%.

The shared Germanic heritage of Danish and English is demonstrated with many common words that are very similar in the two languages. For example, when written, commonly used Danish verbs, nouns, and prepositions such as have, over, under, for, give, flag, salt, and arm are easily recognizable to English speakers.

=== Mutual intelligibility ===
Danish is largely mutually intelligible with Norwegian and Swedish. A proficient speaker of any of the three languages can often understand the others fairly well, though studies have shown that the mutual intelligibility is asymmetric: Norwegian speakers generally understand both Danish and Swedish far better than Swedes or Danes understand each other. Concomitantly, Swedes and Danes understand Norwegian better than they understand each other's languages.

Norwegian occupies the middle position in terms of intelligibility because of its shared border with Sweden, resulting in a similarity in pronunciation, combined with the long tradition of having Danish as a written language, which has led to similarities in vocabulary. Among younger Danes, Copenhageners are worse at understanding Swedish than Danes from the provinces. In general, younger Danes are not as good at understanding the neighboring languages as the young in Norway and Sweden.

Danish is sometimes grouped with Norwegian and Swedish together as "mainland Scandinavian" languages. This contrasts with the "insular Scandinavian" languages Icelandic and Faroese. The Mainland Scandinavian languages have undergone some of the same changes in terms of vocabulary and inflection because of shared geographical proximity and history.

== History ==
The Danish philologist Johannes Brøndum-Nielsen divided the history of Danish into a period from 800 AD to 1525 of Old Danish, which he subdivided into Runic Danish (800–1100), Early Middle Danish (1100–1350) and Late Middle Danish (1350–1525).

=== Runic Danish ===
The approximate extent of Old Norse and related languages in the early 10th century: Old West Norse dialect Old East Norse dialect Old Gutnish dialect Old English Crimean Gothic Other Germanic languages with which Old Norse still retained some mutual intelligibility

Móðir Dyggva var Drótt, dóttir Danps konungs, sonar Rígs er fyrstr var konungr kallaðr á danska tungu.
'Dyggvi's mother was Drott, the daughter of king Danp, Ríg's son, who was the first to be called king in the Danish tongue.'

— Heimskringla by Snorri Sturluson

By the eighth century, the common Germanic language of Scandinavia, Proto-Norse, had undergone some changes and evolved into Old Norse. This language was generally called Dǫnsk tunga 'Danish tongue', or Norrœnt mál 'Norse language'. Norse was written in the runic alphabet, first with the elder futhark and from the 9th century with the younger futhark.

Possibly as far back as the seventh century, the common Norse language began to undergo changes that did not spread to all of Scandinavia, resulting in the appearance of two dialect areas, Old West Norse (Norway and Iceland) and Old East Norse (Denmark and Sweden). Most of the changes separating East Norse from West Norse started as innovations in Denmark, that spread through Scania into Sweden and by maritime contact to southern Norway. A change that separated Old East Norse (Runic Swedish/Danish) from Old West Norse was the change of the diphthong æi (Old West Norse ei) to the monophthong e, as in stæin to sten. This is reflected in runic inscriptions where the older read stain and the later stin. Also, a change of au as in dauðr into ø as in døðr occurred. This change is shown in runic inscriptions as a change from tauþr into tuþr. Moreover, the øy (Old West Norse ey) diphthong changed into ø, as well, as seen in the word ø 'island'. This monophthongization started in Jutland and spread eastward, having spread throughout Denmark and most of Sweden by 1100.

Through Danish conquest, Old East Norse was once widely spoken in the northeast counties of England. Many words derived from Norse, such as gate for 'street', from gade, still survive in Yorkshire, the East Midlands and East Anglia, and parts of eastern England colonized by Danish Vikings. The city of York was once the Viking settlement of Jorvik. Several other English words derive from Old East Norse, for example knife from kniv, husband from husbond, and egg from æg. The suffix -by for 'town' is common in place names in Yorkshire and the east Midlands, for example Selby, Whitby, Derby, and Grimsby. The word dale meaning valley is common in Yorkshire and Derbyshire placenames.

=== Old and Middle dialects ===
Fangær man saar i hor seng mæth annæns mansz kunæ. oc kumær han burt liuænd....
'If one catches someone in the whore-bed with another man's wife and he comes away alive...'

— Jutlandic Law, 1241

In the medieval period, Danish emerged as a separate language from Swedish. The main written language was Latin, and the few Danish-language texts preserved from this period are written in the Latin alphabet, although the runic alphabet seems to have lingered in popular usage in some areas. The main text types written in this period are laws, which were formulated in the vernacular language to be accessible also to those who were not Latinate. The Jutlandic Law and Scanian Law were written in vernacular Danish in the early 13th century. Beginning in 1350, Danish began to be used as a language of administration, and new types of literature began to be written in the language, such as royal letters and testaments. The orthography in this period was not standardized nor was the spoken language, and the regional laws demonstrate the dialectal differences between the regions in which they were written.

Throughout this period, Danish was in contact with Low German, and many Low German loan words were introduced in this period. With the Protestant Reformation in 1536, Danish also became the language of religion, which sparked a new interest in using Danish as a literary language. Also in this period, Danish began to take on the linguistic traits that differentiate it from Swedish and Norwegian, such as the stød, the voicing of many stop consonants, and the weakening of many final vowels to /e/.

The first printed book in Danish dates from 1495, the Rimkrøniken (Rhyming Chronicle), a history book told in rhymed verses. The first complete translation of the Bible in Danish, the Bible of Christian II translated by Christiern Pedersen, was published in 1550. Pedersen's orthographic choices set the de facto standard for subsequent writing in Danish. From around 1500, several printing presses were in operation in Denmark publishing in Danish and other languages. In the period after 1550, presses in Copenhagen dominated the publication of material in the Danish language.

=== Early Modern ===
Herrer og Narre have frit Sprog.
'Lords and jesters have free speech.'

— Peder Syv, proverbs

Following the first Bible translation, the development of Danish as a written language, as a language of religion, administration, and public discourse accelerated. In the second half of the 17th century, grammarians elaborated grammars of Danish, first among them Rasmus Bartholin's 1657 Latin grammar De studio lingvæ danicæ; then Laurids Olufsen Kock's 1660 grammar of the Zealand dialect Introductio ad lingvam Danicam puta selandicam; and in 1685 the first Danish grammar written in Danish, Den Danske Sprog-Kunst ('The Art of the Danish Language') by Peder Syv. Major authors from this period are Thomas Kingo, poet and psalmist, and Leonora Christina Ulfeldt, whose novel Jammersminde (Remembered Woes) is considered a literary masterpiece by scholars. Orthography was still not standardized and the principles for doing so were vigorously discussed among Danish philologists. The grammar of Jens Pedersen Høysgaard was the first to give a detailed analysis of Danish phonology and prosody, including a description of the stød. In this period, scholars were also discussing whether it was best to "write as one speaks" or to "speak as one writes", including whether archaic grammatical forms that had fallen out of use in the vernacular, such as the plural form of verbs, should be conserved in writing, i.e. han er 'he is' vs. de ere 'they are'.

The East Danish provinces were lost to Sweden after the Second Treaty of Brömsebro (1645) after which they were gradually Swedified; just as Norway was politically severed from Denmark, beginning also a gradual end of Danish influence on Norwegian (influence through the shared written standard language remained). With the introduction of absolutism in 1660, the Danish state was further integrated, and the language of the Danish chancellery, a Zealandic variety with German and French influence, became the de facto official standard language, especially in writing — this was the original so-called rigsdansk 'Danish of the Realm'. Also, beginning in the mid-18th century, the skarre-R, the uvular R sound ([ʁ]), began spreading through Denmark, likely through influence from Parisian French and German. It affected all of the areas where Danish had been influential, including all of Denmark, Southern Sweden, and coastal southern Norway.

In the 18th century, Danish philology was advanced by Rasmus Rask, who pioneered the disciplines of comparative and historical linguistics, and wrote the first English-language grammar of Danish. Literary Danish continued to develop with the works of Ludvig Holberg, whose plays and historical and scientific works laid the foundation for the Danish literary canon. With the Danish colonization of Greenland by Hans Egede, Danish became the administrative and religious language there, while Iceland and the Faroe Islands had the status of Danish colonies with Danish as an official language until the mid-20th century.

=== Standardized national language ===
Moders navn er vort Hjertesprog,
kun løs er al fremmed Tale.
Det alene i mund og bog,
kan vække et folk af dvale.
'Mother's name is our hearts' tongue,
only idle is all foreign speech
It alone, in mouth or in book,
can rouse a people from sleep.'

— N.F.S. Grundtvig, "Modersmaalet"

The so-called "Golden Age" was an important period in the development of Danish literary culture. Authors such as N.F.S. Grundtvig emphasized the role of language in creating national belonging. Some of the most cherished Danish-language authors of this period are existential philosopher Søren Kierkegaard and prolific fairy tale author Hans Christian Andersen.

Throughout the 19th century, Danes emigrated, establishing small expatriate communities in the Americas, particularly in the United States, Canada, and Argentina, where memory and some use of Danish remains today.

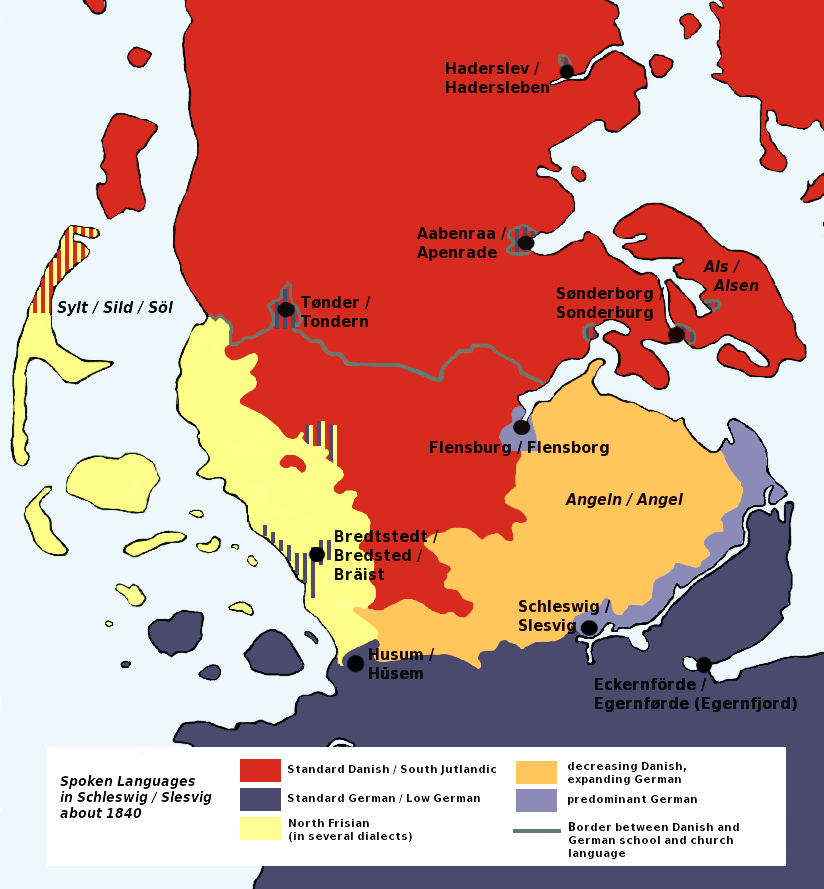
Language shift in the 19th century in southern Schleswig

Following the loss of Schleswig to Germany, the Danish language in the region lost status. After the Schleswig referendum in 1920, a number of Danes remained as a minority within German territories. After the occupation of Denmark by Germany in World War II, the 1948 orthography reform dropped the German-influenced rule of capitalizing nouns, and introduced the letter ⟨å⟩.

With the exclusive use of rigsdansk, the High Copenhagen Standard, in national broadcasting, the traditional dialects came under increased pressure. In the 20th century, they have all but disappeared, and the standard language has extended throughout the country. Minor regional pronunciation variation of the standard language, sometimes called regionssprog 'regional languages' remain, and are in some cases vital. Today, the major varieties of Standard Danish are High Copenhagen Standard, associated with elderly, well to-do, and well educated people of the capital, and low Copenhagen speech traditionally associated with the working class, but today adopted as the prestige variety of the younger generations. Also, in the 21st century, the influence of immigration has had linguistic consequences, such as the emergence of a so-called multiethnolect in the urban areas, an immigrant Danish variety (also known as Perkerdansk), combining elements of different immigrant languages such as Arabic, Turkish, and Kurdish, as well as English and Danish.

== Geographic distribution and status ==
=== Danish Realm ===
Within the Danish Realm, Danish is the national language of Denmark and one of two official languages of the Faroe Islands (alongside Faroese). There is a Faroese variant of Danish known as Gøtudanskt. Until 2009, Danish was also one of two official languages of Greenland (alongside Greenlandic). Danish now acts as a lingua franca in Greenland, with a large percentage of native Greenlanders able to speak Danish as a second language (it was introduced into the education system as a compulsory language in 1928). About 10% of the population speaks Danish as their first language, due to immigration.

Iceland was a territory ruled by Denmark–Norway, one of whose official languages was Danish. Though Danish ceased to be an official language in Iceland in 1944, it is still widely used and is a mandatory subject in school, taught as a second foreign language from 7th grade after English.

No law stipulates an official language for Denmark, making Danish the de facto official language only. The Code of Civil Procedure does, however, lay down Danish as the language of the courts. Since 1997, public authorities have been obliged to follow the official spelling system laid out in the Orthography Law. In the 21st century, discussions have been held with a view to create a law that would make Danish the official language of Denmark.

=== Surrounding countries ===
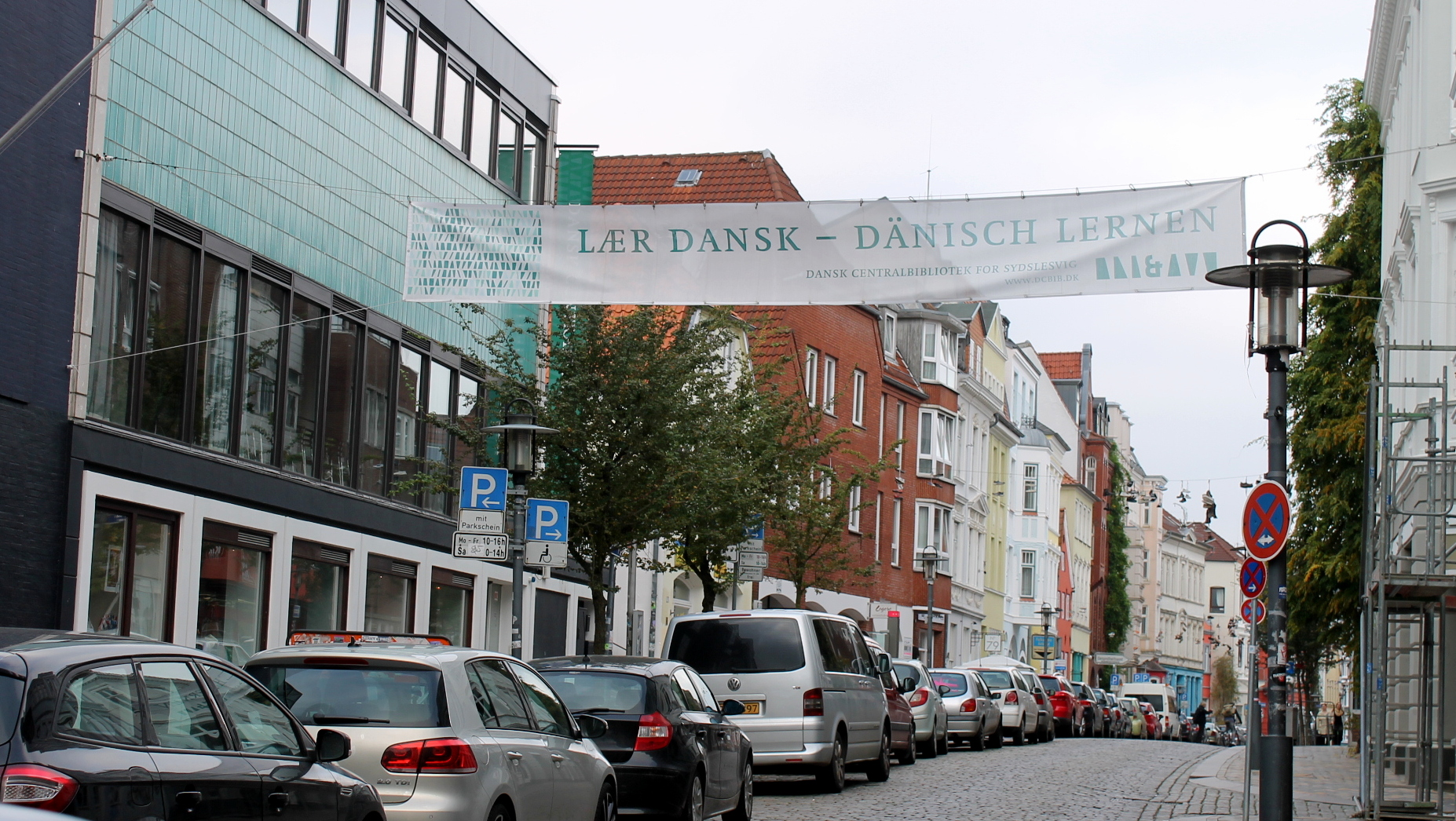
Learn Danish banner in Flensburg, Germany, where it is an officially recognized regional language

In addition, a noticeable community of Danish speakers is in Southern Schleswig, the portion of Germany bordering Denmark, and a variant of Standard Danish, Southern Schleswig Danish, is spoken in the area. Since 2015, Schleswig-Holstein has officially recognized Danish as a regional language, just as German is north of the border. Furthermore, Danish is one of the official languages of the European Union and one of the working languages of the Nordic Council. Under the Nordic Language Convention, Danish-speaking citizens of the Nordic countries have the opportunity to use their native language when interacting with official bodies in other Nordic countries without being liable for any interpretation or translation costs.

The more widespread of the two varieties of written Norwegian, Bokmål, is very close to Danish, because standard Danish was used as the de facto administrative language until 1814 and one of the official languages of Denmark–Norway. Bokmål is based on Danish (specifically Dano-Norwegian), unlike the other variety of Norwegian, Nynorsk, which is based on the Norwegian dialects, with Old Norwegian as an important reference point.

=== Other locations ===
There are also Danish emigrant communities in other places of the world who still use the language in some form. In the Americas, Danish-speaking communities can be found in the US, Canada, Argentina and Brazil.

== Dialects ==
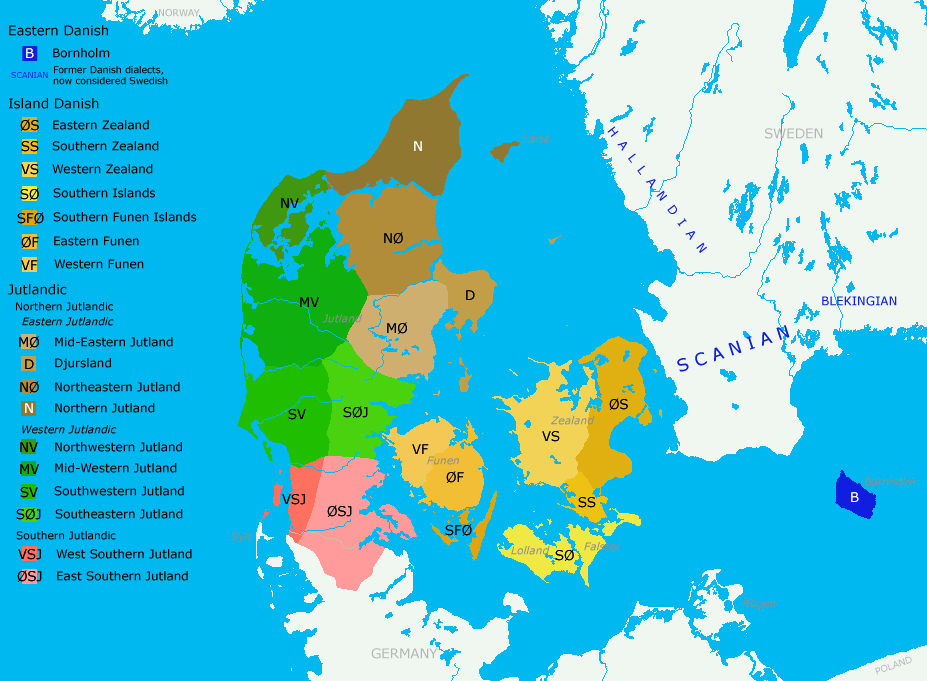
Map of Danish dialects

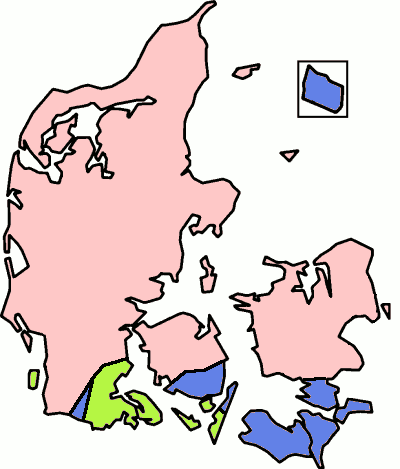
A map showing the distribution of stød in Danish dialects: Dialects in the pink areas have stød, as in standard Danish, while those in the green ones have tones, as in Swedish and Norwegian. Dialects in the blue areas have (like Icelandic, German, and English) neither stød nor tones.

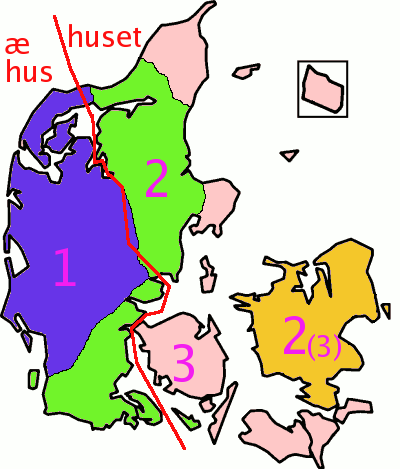
The distribution of one, two, and three grammatical genders in Danish dialects. In Zealand, the transition from three to two genders has happened fairly recently. West of the red line, the definite article goes before the word as in English or German; east of the line it takes the form of a suffix.

Standard Danish (rigsdansk) is the language based on dialects spoken in and around the capital, Copenhagen. Unlike Swedish and Norwegian, Danish does not have more than one regional speech norm. More than 25% of all Danish speakers live in the metropolitan area of the capital, and most government agencies, institutions, and major businesses keep their main offices in Copenhagen, which has resulted in a very homogeneous national speech norm.

Danish dialects can be divided into the traditional dialects, which differ from modern Standard Danish in both phonology and grammar, and the Danish accents or regional languages, which are local varieties of the Standard language distinguished mostly by pronunciation and local vocabulary colored by traditional dialects. Traditional dialects are now mostly extinct in Denmark, with only the oldest generations still speaking them.

Danish traditional dialects are divided into three main dialect areas:

- Insular Danish (ømål), including dialects of the Danish islands of Zealand, Funen, Lolland, Falster, and Møn
- Jutlandic (jysk), further divided in North, East, West, and South Jutlandic
- East Danish (østdansk), including dialects of Bornholm (bornholmsk), Scania, Halland and Blekinge

Jutlandic is further divided into Southern Jutlandic and Northern Jutlandic, with Northern Jutlandic subdivided into North Jutlandic and West Jutlandic. Insular Danish is divided into Zealand, Funen, Møn, and Lolland-Falster dialect areas―each with additional internal variation. Bornholmian is the only Eastern Danish dialect spoken in Denmark. Since the Swedish conquest of the Eastern Danish provinces Skåne, Halland and Blekinge in 1645/1658, the Eastern Danish dialects there have come under heavy Swedish influence. Many residents now speak regional variants of Standard Swedish. However, many researchers still consider the dialects in Scania, Halland (hallandsk) and Blekinge (blekingsk) as part of the East Danish dialect group. The Swedish National Encyclopedia from 1995 classifies Scanian as an Eastern Danish dialect with South Swedish elements.

Traditional dialects differ in phonology, grammar, and vocabulary from standard Danish. Phonologically, one of the most diagnostic differences is the presence or absence of stød. Four main regional variants for the realization of stød are known: In Southeastern Jutlandic, Southernmost Funen, Southern Langeland, and Ærø, no stød is used, but instead a pitch accent (like in Norwegian, Swedish and Gutnish). South of a line (stødgrænsen, 'the stød border') going through central South Jutland, crossing Southern Funen and central Langeland and north of Lolland-Falster, Møn, Southern Zealand and Bornholm neither stød nor pitch accent exists. Most of Jutland and on Zealand use stød, and in Zealandic traditional dialects and regional language, stød occurs more often than in the standard language. In Zealand, the stød line divides Southern Zealand (without stød), an area which used to be directly under the Crown, from the rest of the Island that used to be the property of various noble estates.

Grammatically, a dialectally significant feature is the number of grammatical genders. Standard Danish has two genders and the definite form of nouns is formed by the use of suffixes, while Western Jutlandic has only one gender and the definite form of nouns uses an article before the noun itself, in the same fashion as West Germanic languages. The Bornholmian dialect has maintained to this day many archaic features, such as a distinction between three grammatical genders. Insular Danish traditional dialects also conserved three grammatical genders. By 1900, Zealand insular dialects had been reduced to two genders under influence from the standard language, but other Insular varieties, such as Funen dialect had not. Besides using three genders, the old Insular or Funen dialect, could also use personal pronouns (like he and she) in certain cases, particularly referring to animals. A classic example in traditional Funen dialect is the sentence: Katti, han får unger, literally The cat, he is having kittens, because cat is a masculine noun, thus is referred to as han 'he', even if it is a female cat.

== Phonology ==
Spoken Standard Danish of a male born 1978 in Esbjerg.

The sound system of Danish is unusual, particularly in its large vowel inventory. In informal or rapid speech, the language is prone to considerable reduction of unstressed syllables, creating many vowel-less syllables with syllabic consonants, as well as reduction of final consonants. Furthermore, the language's prosody does not include many clues about the sentence structure, unlike many other languages, making it relatively more difficult to perceive the different sounds of the speech flow. These factors taken together make Danish pronunciation difficult to master for learners, and research shows Danish children take slightly longer in learning to segment speech in early childhood.

=== Vowels ===
Although somewhat depending on analysis, most modern variants of Danish distinguish 12 long vowels, 13 short vowels, and two central vowels, /ə/ and /ɐ/, which only occur in unstressed syllables. This gives a total of 27 different vowel phonemes – a very large number among the world's languages. At least 19 different diphthongs also occur, all with a short first vowel and the second segment being either [j], [w], or [ɐ̯]. The table below shows the approximate distribution of the vowels as given by Grønnum (1998a) in Modern Standard Danish, with the symbols used in IPA/Danish. Questions of analysis may give a slightly different inventory, for example based on whether r-colored vowels are considered distinct phonemes. Basbøll (2005:50) gives 25 "full vowels", not counting the two unstressed "schwa" vowels.

	Front				Central		Back	
	unrounded		rounded		Central		Back	
	short	long	short	long	short	long	short	long
Close	i	iː	y	yː			u	uː
Close-mid	e	eː	ø	øː	ə		o	oː
Open-mid	ɛ	ɛː	œ	œː	ɐ		ɔ	ɔː
Open	a	aː			ɑ	ɑː	ɒ	ɒː

=== Consonants ===
The consonant inventory is comparatively simple. Basbøll (2005:73) distinguishes 17 non-syllabic consonant phonemes in Danish.

		Labial	Alveolar	Palatal	Velar	Uvular	Glottal
Nasal		m	n		ŋ		
Plosive/ Affricate	tenuis	p /b/	t /d/		k /g/		
Plosive/ Affricate	aspirated	pʰ /p/	tsʰ /t/		kʰ /k/		
Fricative		f	s	(ɕ)			h
Approximant	median	ʋ /v/	ð	j	(w)	ʁ /r/	
Approximant	lateral		l				

- /r/ has also been described as pharyngeal.

Many of these phonemes have quite different allophones in onset and coda where intervocalic consonants followed by a full vowel are treated as in onset, otherwise as in coda. Phonetically there is no voicing distinction among the stops, rather the distinction is one of aspiration. /p t k/ are aspirated in onset realized as [pʰ, tsʰ, kʰ], but not in coda. The pronunciation of t, [tsʰ], is in between a simple aspirated [tʰ] and a fully affricated [tsʰ] (as has happened in German with the second High German consonant shift from t to z). There is dialectal variation, and some Jutlandic dialects may be less affricated than other varieties, with Northern and Western Jutlandic traditional dialects having an almost unaspirated dry t.

/v/ is pronounced as a [w] in syllable coda, so e.g. /ɡraːvə/ (grave) is pronounced [kʁɑːwə]. Otherwise /v/ is realized as [ʋ].

[ʋ, ð] often have slight frication, but are usually pronounced as approximants. Danish [ð] differs from the English sound that is conventionally transcribed with the same IPA symbol, in that it is not a dental fricative but an alveolar approximant which is frequently heard as [l] by second language learners.

The sound [ɕ] is found for example in the word /sjovˀ/ 'fun' pronounced [ɕɒwˀ] and /tjalˀ/ 'marijuana' pronounced [tɕælˀ]. Some analyses have posited it as a phoneme, but since it occurs only after /s/ or /t/ and [j] does not occur after these phonemes, it can be analyzed as an allophone of /j/, which is devoiced after voiceless alveolar frication. This makes it unnecessary to postulate a /ɕ/-phoneme in Danish.

In onset, /r/ is realized as a uvular-pharyngeal approximant, [ʁ̞], but in coda it is either realized as a non-syllabic low central vowel, [ɐ̯] or simply coalesces with the preceding vowel.

=== Prosody ===
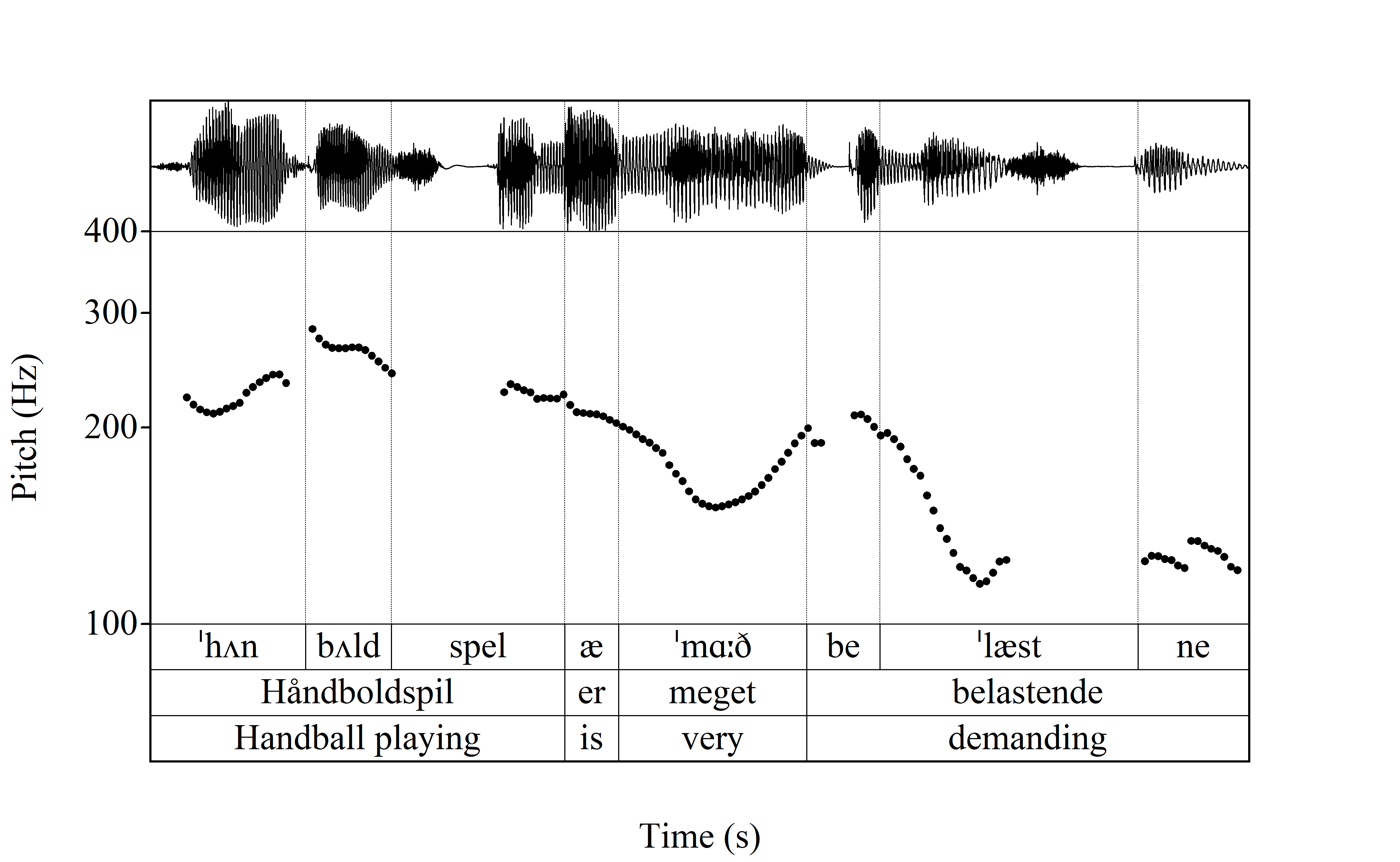
A pitch trace of the sentence Håndboldspil er meget belastende 'Handball playing is very demanding'.

Danish is characterized by a prosodic feature called stød (lit. 'thrust'). This is a form of laryngealization or creaky voice. Some sources have described it as a glottal stop, but this is a very infrequent realization, and today phoneticians consider it a phonation type or a prosodic phenomenon. The occurrence is also dependent on stress, and some varieties also realize it primarily as a tone. The stød has phonemic status, since it serves as the sole distinguishing feature of words with different meanings in minimal pairs such as bønder 'peasants' with stød, versus bønner 'beans' without stød. The distribution of stød in the vocabulary is related to the distribution of the common Scandinavian pitch accents found in most dialects of Norwegian and Swedish.

Stress is phonemic and distinguishes words such as billigst /ˈbilisd/ 'cheapest' and bilist /biˈlisd/ 'car driver'.

Intonation reflects the stress group, sentence type and prosodic phrase. In Copenhagen Standard Danish, the pitch pattern reaches its lowest peak within the stress group on the stressed syllable followed by its highest peak on the following unstressed syllable, after which it declines gradually until the next stress group. In interaction, pitch can mark e.g. the end of a story and turn-taking.

== Grammar ==
Similarly to the case of English, modern Danish grammar is the result of a gradual change from a typical Indo-European dependent-marking pattern with a rich inflectional morphology and relatively free word order, to a mostly analytic pattern with little inflection, a fairly fixed SVO word order and a complex syntax. Some traits typical of Germanic languages persist in Danish, such as the distinction between irregularly inflected strong stems inflected through ablaut or umlaut (i.e. changing the vowel of the stem, as in the pairs tager/tog 'takes/took' and fod/fødder 'foot/feet' and weak stems inflected through affixation, such as elsker/elskede 'love/loved' and bil/biler 'car/cars'. Vestiges of the Germanic case and gender system are found in the pronoun system. Typical for an Indo-European language, Danish follows accusative morphosyntactic alignment. Danish distinguishes at least seven major word classes: verbs, nouns, numerals, adjectives, adverbs, articles, prepositions, conjunctions, interjections and onomatopoeia.

=== Nouns ===
Nouns are inflected for number (singular vs. plural) and definiteness, and are classified into two grammatical genders. Only pronouns inflect for case, and the previous genitive case has become an enclitic. A distinctive feature of the Nordic languages, including Danish, is that the definite articles, which also mark noun gender, have developed into suffixes. Typical of Germanic languages plurals are either irregular or "strong" stems inflected through umlaut, i.e. changing the vowel of the stem (e.g. fod/fødder 'foot/feet', mand/mænd 'man/men'), or regular or "weak" stems inflected through affixation (e.g. skib/skibe 'ship/ships', kvinde/kvinder 'woman/women').

==== Gender ====
Standard Danish has two nominal genders: common and neuter; the common gender arose as the historical feminine and masculine genders conflated into a single category. Some traditional dialects retain a three-way gender distinction, between masculine, feminine and neuter, and some dialects of Jutland have a masculine/feminine contrast. While the majority of Danish nouns (ca. 75%) have the common gender, and neuter is often used for inanimate objects, the genders of nouns are not generally predictable and must in most cases be memorized. The gender of a noun determines the form of adjectives that modify it, and the form of the definite suffixes.

==== Definiteness ====
Danish regular plural patterns
Class 1			Class 2			Class 3		
Sg.	Pl.	Pl. definite.	Sg.	Pl.	Pl. definite.	Sg.	Pl.	Pl. definite.
måned month	måneder months	månederne the months	dag day	dage days	dagene the days	år year	år years	årene the years
bil car	biler cars	bilerne the cars	hund dog	hunde dogs	hundene the dogs	fisk fish	fisk fish (pl.)	fiskene the fishes

Definiteness is marked by two mutually exclusive articles: either a postposed enclitic or a preposed article which is the obligatory way to mark definiteness when nouns are modified by an adjective. Neuter nouns take the clitic -et, and common gender nouns take -en. Indefinite nouns take the articles en (common gender) or et (neuter). Hence, the common gender noun en mand 'a man' (indefinite) has the definite form manden 'the man', whereas the neuter noun et hus 'a house' (indefinite) has the definite form, 'the house' (definite) huset.

Jeg så et hus
I saw a house

Jeg så {huset}
I saw {the house}

Jeg så det store hus
I saw the big house

The plural definite ending is -(e)ne, e.g. drenge 'boys' > drengene 'the boys' and piger 'girls' > pigerne 'the girls', and nouns ending in -ere lose the last -e before adding the -ne suffix, e.g. danskere 'Danes' > danskerne 'the Danes'. When the noun is modified by an adjective, the definiteness is marked by the definite article, either den for common gender nouns or det for neuter, and the definite form of the adjective: den store mand 'the big man', det store hus 'the big house'.

==== Number ====
Danish irregular plurals
Sg.	Pl.	Pl. definite
mand man	mænd men	mændene the men
ko cow	køer cows	køerne the cows
øje eye	øjne eyes	øjnene the eyes
konto account	konti accounts	kontiene the accounts

There are three different types of regular plurals: Class 1 forms the plural with the suffix -er (indefinite) and -erne (definite), Class 2 with the suffix -e (indefinite) and -ene (definite), and Class 3 takes no suffix for the plural indefinite form and -ene for the plural definite.

Most irregular nouns have an ablaut plural (i.e. with a change in the stem vowel), or combine ablaut stem-change with the suffix, and some have unique plural forms. Unique forms may be inherited, e.g. the plural of øje 'eye', which is the old dual form øjne 'eyes', or for loan words they may be borrowed from the donor language, e.g. the word konto 'account' which is borrowed from Italian and uses the Italian masculine plural form konti 'accounts'.

==== Possession ====
Possessive phrases are formed with the enclitic -s, for example min fars hus 'my father's house' where the possessive clitic is placed at the end of the noun far 'father'. This is however not an example of genitive case marking, because in the case of longer noun phrases the -s attaches to the last word in the phrase, which need not be the head-noun or even a noun at all:

kongen af Danmarks bolsjefabrik
{the king} of Denmark's {candy factory}

det er {pigen} Uffe bor sammen meds datter
that is {the girl} Uffe lives together with's daughter
'That is the daughter of the girl that Uffe lives with'

==== Nominal compounds ====
Like all Germanic languages, Danish forms compound nouns. These are represented in Danish orthography as one word, as in kvindehåndboldlandsholdet 'the women's national handball team'. In some cases, nouns are joined with -s- as a linking element, like landsmand 'compatriot' formed from land 'country', and mand 'man', while others are unmarked, e.g. landmand 'farmer' from the same roots. Some words are joined with -e- instead, like gæstebog 'guest book' from gæst 'guest' and bog 'book'. The rules for linking elements are complex and there are also irregular linking elements.

=== Pronouns ===
Danish personal pronouns
Person	Nominative	Oblique	Possessive
1st sg.	jeg I	mig me	min/mit/mine my, mine
2nd sg.	du you (sg.)	dig you (sg.)	din/dit/dine your(s) (sg.)
3rd sg.	han/hun /den/det he/she/it	ham/hende /den/det him/her/it	hans/hendes /dens/dets his/her(s)/its
1st pl.	vi we	os us	vores our(s)
2nd pl.	I you (pl.)	jer you (pl.)	jeres your(s) (pl.)
3rd pl.	de they	dem them	deres their(s)
3rd refl.	N/A	sig him/her/itself, themself/selves	sin/sit/sine his/her(s) /its (own)

As in English, the Danish pronominal system makes a distinction between nominative and oblique case. The nominative form of pronouns is used when pronouns occur as grammatical subject of a sentence (and only when non-coordinated and without a following modifier). The oblique forms are used for all non-subject functions including direct and indirect object, predicative, comparative and other types of constructions. The third person singular pronouns also distinguish between animate masculine han 'he' and animate feminine hun 'she', as well as inanimate neuter det 'it' and inanimate common gender den 'it'.

- Jeg sover: 'I sleep'
- Du sover: 'you sleep'
- Jeg kysser dig: 'I kiss you'
- Du kysser mig: 'you kiss me'

Possessive pronouns have independent and adjectival uses, but the same form. The form is used both adjectivally preceding a possessed noun, e.g. det er min hest 'it is my horse', and independently in place of the possessed noun, e.g. den er min 'it is mine'. In the third person singular, sin is used when the possessor is also the subject of the sentence, whereas hans 'his', hendes 'her' or dens/dets 'its' is used when the possessor is different from the grammatical subject.

Han tog sin hat
He took {his (own)} hat

Han tog hans hat
He took his hat

=== Verbs ===
Danish verbal forms
infinitive	Present	Past
at være to be	er is/are/am	var was/were
at se to see	ser sees	så saw
at vide to know	ved knows	vidste knew
at huske to remember	husker remembers	huskede remembered
at glemme to forget	glemmer forgets	glemte forgot

Danish verbs are morphologically simple, marking very few grammatical categories. They do not mark person or number of subject, although the marking of plural subjects was still used in writing as late as the 19th century. Verbs have a past, non-past and infinitive form, past and present participle forms, and a passive, and an imperative.

==== Tense, aspect, mood, and voice ====
Verbs can be divided into two main conjugation classes, the strong/irregular verbs and the regular/weak verbs. The regular verbs are also divided into two classes, those that take the past suffix -te and those that take the suffix -ede.

The infinitive always ends in a vowel, usually -e (pronounced [ə]), and is preceded by the infinitive marker at (pronounced [ʌ]) in some syntactic functions. The non-past or present tense takes the suffix -r, except for a few strong verbs that have irregular non-past forms. The past form does not necessarily mark past tense, but also counterfactuality or conditionality, and the non-past has many uses besides present tense time reference.

The present participle ends in -ende, e.g. løbende 'running'. The past participle ends in -(e)t, e.g. løbet 'run', or -t, e.g. købt 'bought'.

The perfect tense is constructed with have 'to have' and participial forms, like in English. But some intransitive verb forms use være 'to be' instead, and some may use both with a difference in meaning.

- Hun har gået. Flyet har fløjet: She has walked. The plane has flown
- Hun er gået. Flyet er fløjet: She has left. The plane has taken off
- Hun havde gået. Flyet havde fløjet: She had walked. The plane had flown
- Hun var gået. Flyet var fløjet: She had left. The plane had taken off

The passive form takes the suffix -s: avisen læses hver dag 'the newspaper is read every day'. Another passive construction uses the auxiliary verb blive 'become': avisen bliver læst hver dag.

The imperative form is the infinitive without the final schwa-vowel, with stød potentially being applied depending on syllable structure.

- løb!: 'run!'

=== Numerals ===
Certain numerals are formed on the basis of a vigesimal system with various rules. In the word forms of numbers above 20, the units are stated before the tens, so 21 is rendered enogtyve, literally "one and twenty".

The numeral halvanden means 1 1/2 (literally "half second", implying "one plus half of the second one"). The analogous numerals halvtredje (2 1/2), halvfjerde (3 1/2) and halvfemte (4 1/2) are obsolete, but are still implicitly used in the vigesimal system described below. Similarly, the temporal designation klokken halv tre, literally "half three (o'clock)", is half past two.

One peculiar feature of the Danish language is that the numerals 50, 60, 70, 80 and 90 are based on a vigesimal system (like the French numerals from 80 through 99), meaning that the score (20) is used as a base unit in counting. Tres is short for tre-sinds-tyve "three times twenty" and means 60, while 50 is halvtreds, short for halvtredje-sinds-tyve "2 1/2 times twenty", using halv- as described above. The ending sindstyve, meaning "times twenty", is no longer included in cardinal numbers, but may still be used in ordinal numbers. Thus, in modern Danish, 52 is usually rendered as tooghalvtreds, from the now obsolete tooghalvtredsindstyve, whereas 52nd is either tooghalvtredsende or tooghalvtredsindstyvende.

Twenty is tyve, derived from Old Danish tiughu, Old Norse form tuttugu, meaning "two tens", while thirty is tredive, and forty is fyrre, from Old Danish fyritiughu "four tens". For forty, the archaism fyrretyve is sometimes used. Thus, the suffix -tyve should be understood as a plural of ti (10), though the independent word tyve means 20, making it hard to explain why fyrretyve is 40 (four tens) and not 80 (four twenties).

Cardinal numeral	Danish	Literal translation	Ordinal numeral	Danish	Literal translation
1	én / ét	one	1st	første	first
10	ti	ten	10th	tiende	tenth
20	tyve	two tens	20th	tyvende	two-tenth
30	tredive	three tens	30th	tredivte	three-tenth
40	fyrre(tyve)	four (tens)	40th	fyrretyvende	four-tenth
50	halvtreds(indstyve)	2 1/2 (times twenty)	50th	halvtredsindstyvende	2 1/2-times-twentieth
60	tres(indstyve)	three (times twenty)	60th	tresindstyvende	three-times-twentieth
70	halvfjerds(indstyve)	3 1/2 (times twenty)	70th	halvfjerdsindstyvende	3 1/2-times-twentieth
80	firs(indstyve)	four (times twenty)	80th	firsindstyvende	four-times-twentieth
90	halvfems(indstyve)	4 1/2 (times twenty)	90th	halvfemsindstyvende	4 1/2-times-twentieth
100	hundrede	hundred	100th	hundrede	hundredth

For large numbers (one billion or larger), Danish uses the long scale, so that the short-scale billion (1,000,000,000) is called milliard, and the short-scale trillion (1,000,000,000,000) is billion.

=== Syntax ===
Danish basic constituent order in simple sentences with both a subject and an object is Subject–Verb–Object. However, Danish is also a V2 language, which means that the verb must always be the second constituent of the sentence. Following the Danish grammarian Paul Diderichsen Danish grammar tends to be analyzed as consisting of slots or fields, and in which certain types of sentence material can be moved to the pre-verbal (or foundation) field to achieve different pragmatic effects. Usually the sentence material occupying the preverbal slot has to be pragmatically marked, usually either new information or topics. There is no rule that subjects must occur in the preverbal slot, but since subject and topic often coincide, they often do. Therefore, whenever any sentence material that is not the subject occurs in the preverbal position the subject is demoted to postverbal position and the sentence order becomes VSO.

- Peter (S) så (V) Jytte (O): 'Peter saw Jytte'

but

- I går så (V) Peter (S) Jytte (O): 'Yesterday, Peter saw Jytte'

When there is no pragmatically marked constituents in the sentence to take the preverbal slot (for example when all the information is new), the slot has to take a dummy subject der 'there'.

- der kom en pige ind ad døren: there came a girl in through the door, 'A girl came in the door'

==== Main clauses ====
Haberland (1994, p. 336) describes the basic order of sentence constituents in main clauses as comprising the following 8 positions:

Og	ham	havde	Per	ikke	skænket	en tanke	i årevis
And	him	had	Per	not	given	a thought	for years
0	1	2	3	4	5	6	7
'And him Per hadn't given a thought in years'

Position 0 is not part of the sentence and can only contain sentential connectors (such as conjunctions or interjections). Position 1 can contain any sentence constituent. Position 2 can only contain the finite verb. Position 3 is the subject position, unless the subject is fronted to occur in position 1. Position 4 can only contain light adverbs and the negation. Position 5 is for non-finite verbs, such as auxiliaries. Position 6 is the position of direct and indirect objects, and position 7 is for heavy adverbial constituents.

Questions with question words (wh-questions or content questions) are formed differently from yes/no questions. In content questions the question word occupies the preverbal field, regardless of whether its grammatical role is subject or object or adverbial. In yes/no questions the preverbal field is empty, so that the sentence begins with the verb.

Wh-question:

- hvem så hun?: whom saw she, 'whom did she see?'
- så hun ham?: saw she him?, 'did she see him?'

==== Subordinate clauses ====
In subordinate clauses, the word order differs from that of main clauses. In the subordinate clause structure the verb is preceded by the subject and any light adverbial material (e.g. negation). Complement clauses begin with the particle at 'that', while relative clauses are introduced by the relative pronouns som or der 'who, that'.

Han sagde, at han ikke ville gå
he said that he not would go
'He said that he did not want to go'

Jeg kender en mand, som bor i Helsingør
'I know a man who lives in Elsinore'

== Writing system and alphabet ==
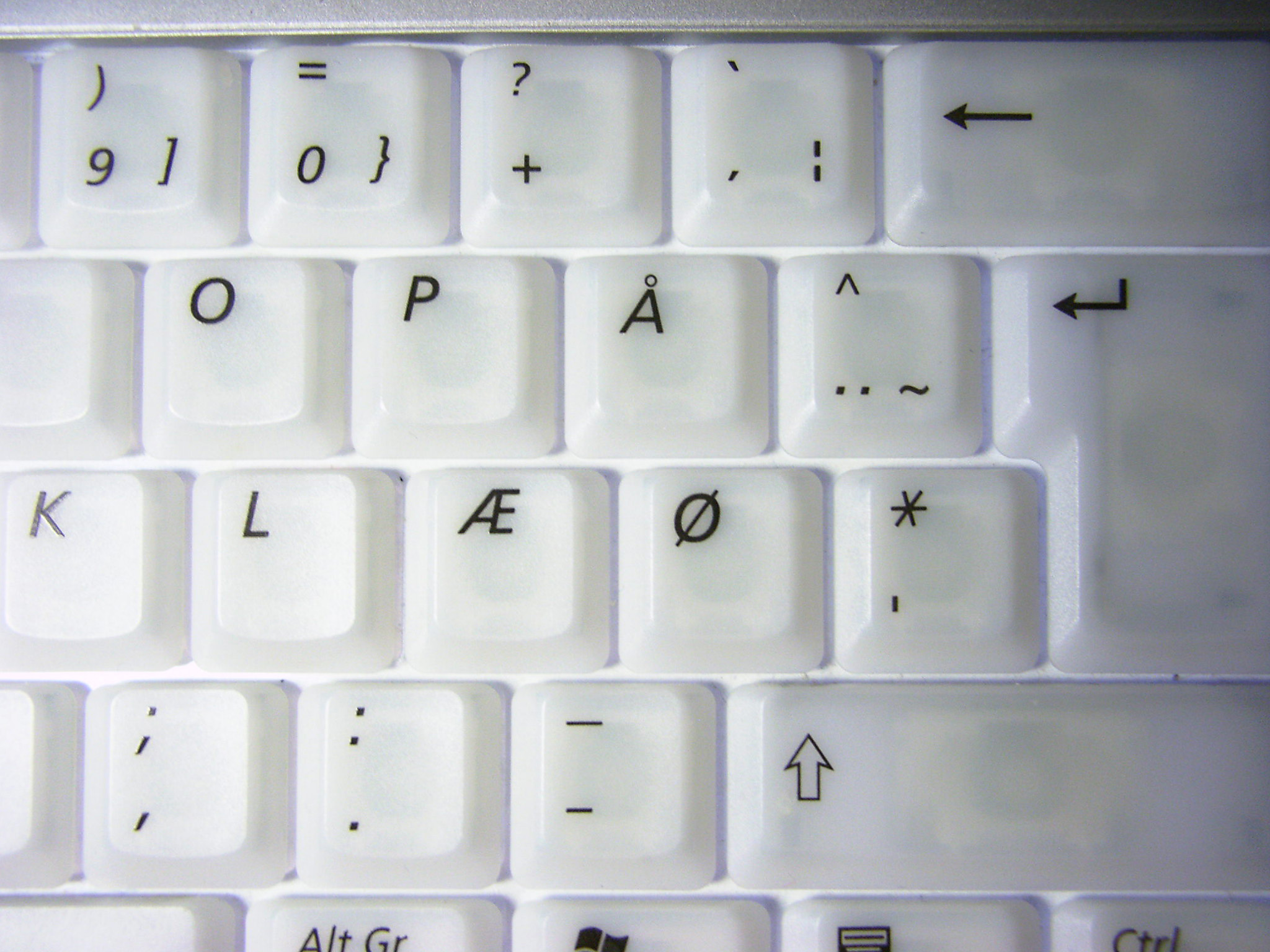
Danish keyboard with keys for ⟨Æ⟩, ⟨Ø⟩, and ⟨Å⟩

The oldest preserved examples of written Danish (from the Iron and Viking Ages) are in the Runic alphabet. The introduction of Christianity also brought the Latin script to Denmark. After the 13th century, runes had essentially been replaced by Latin letters.

Danish orthography is conservative, using most of the conventions established in the 16th century. The spoken language however has changed a lot since then, creating a gap between the spoken and written languages. Since 1955, Dansk Sprognævn has been the official language council in Denmark.

The modern Danish alphabet is similar to the English one, with three additional letters: ⟨æ⟩, ⟨ø⟩, and ⟨å⟩, which come at the end of the alphabet, in that order. The letters ⟨c⟩, ⟨q⟩, ⟨w⟩, ⟨x⟩ and ⟨z⟩ are only used in loan words. A spelling reform in 1948 introduced the letter ⟨å⟩, already in use in Norwegian and Swedish, into the Danish alphabet to replace the digraph ⟨aa⟩. ⟨Aa⟩ is still used in some person and place names; for example, the name of the cities of Aalborg and Aabenraa are spelled with ⟨Aa⟩ following decision by the local municipalities. Aarhus decided to go back to ⟨Aa⟩ in 2011. When representing the same sound as ⟨å⟩, ⟨aa⟩ is treated like ⟨å⟩ in alphabetical sorting, though it appears to be two letters.

The 1948 spelling reform also changed the spelling of a few common words, such as the past tense verbs vilde 'would', kunde 'could' and skulde 'should', to their current forms of ville, kunne and skulle (making them identical to the infinitives in writing, as they are in speech). Modern Danish and Norwegian use the same alphabet, though spelling differs slightly, particularly with the phonetic spelling of loanwords.

== Example text ==
Danish pronunciation

Article 1 of the Universal Declaration of Human Rights in Danish:

Alle mennesker er født frie og lige i værdighed og rettigheder. De er udstyret med fornuft og samvittighed, og de bør handle mod hverandre i en broderskabets ånd.

Article 1 of the Universal Declaration of Human Rights in English:

All human beings are born free and equal in dignity and rights. They are endowed with reason and conscience and should act towards one another in a spirit of brotherhood.

== See also ==
Realm languages:

- Faroese
- Greenlandic

Nordic languages:

- Icelandic
- Norwegian
- Swedish

== Bibliography ==
- Åkesson, K. L. (2005). Håller språket ihop Norden?: en forskningsrapport om ungdomars förståelse av danska, svenska och norska. Nordic Council of Ministers.
- Allan, Robin; Lundskaer-Nielsen, Tom; Holmes, Philip (2005). Danish: An essential grammar. Routledge.
- Arboe, Torben (2008). "Pronominal repræsentation i danske dialekter" ( (PDF)). 12. Møde om Udforskningen af Dansk Sprog. pp. 29–38. Archived from the original on 18 May 2015.
- Basbøll, Hans (2005). The Phonology of Danish. Oxford University Press. ISBN 978-0-19-824268-0.
- Basbøll, Hans (2018). "Danish imperative formation: A problem for the phonology/morphology interface". Scandinavian Philology. 16 (2): 219–244. doi:10.21638/11701/spbu21.2018.203.
- Becker-Christensen, Christian (2010). Dansk syntaks. Samfundslitteratur.
- Bleses, D.; Vach, W.; Slott, M.; Wehberg, S.; Thomsen, P.; Madsen, T. O.; Basbøll, H. (2008). "Early vocabulary development in Danish and other languages: A CDI-based comparison". Journal of Child Language. 35 (3): 619–650. doi:10.1017/s0305000908008714. PMID 18588717. S2CID 30992551.
- Bredsdorff, Elias (1958). Danish: an elementary grammar and reader. Cambridge University Press.
- Dal, Erik (1991). "Latin og dansk i danica 1482–1600". In Alenius, Marianne; Bergh, Birger; Boserup, Ivan; Friis-Jensen, Karsten; Jensen, Minna Skafte (eds.). Latin og nationalsprog i Norden efter reformationen. Museum Tusculanum Press. pp. 69–72. ISBN 87-7289-146-7.
- Diderichsen, Paul (1974). Elementær dansk grammatik (3rd ed.). København: Gyldendal.
- Ejskjær, Inger (1990). "Stød and pitch accents in the Danish dialects". Acta Linguistica Hafniensia. 22 (1): 49–75. doi:10.1080/03740463.1990.10411522.
- Faarlund, Jan Terje (1994). "Old and Middle Scandinavian". In König, Ekkehard; van der Auwera, Johan (eds.). The Germanic Languages. Routledge Language Family Descriptions. Routledge. pp. 39–71. doi:10.4324/9781315812786. ISBN 978-0-415-28079-2.
- Frederiksen, Katti; Olsen, Carl Christian (2017). Det grønlandske sprog i dag (PDF). Saammaateqatigiinnissamut Isumalioqatigiissitaq. Archived from the original (PDF) on 9 May 2018.
- Fischer-Jørgensen, Eli (1989). "Phonetic analysis of the stød in standard Danish". Phonetica. 46 (1–3): 1–59. doi:10.1159/000261828. PMID 2608724. S2CID 3227109.
- Grønnum, Nina (1998a). "Illustrations of the IPA: Danish". Journal of the International Phonetic Association. 28 (1 & 2): 99–105. doi:10.1017/s0025100300006290. S2CID 249412109.
- Grønnum, Nina (1998b). "Intonation in Danish". In Hirst, Daniel; Cristo, Albert Di (eds.). Intonation Systems. Cambridge: Cambridge University Press. pp. 131–151. ISBN 9780521395137. Archived from the original on 22 May 2022.
- Grønnum, Nina (2005). Fonetik og fonologi, Almen og Dansk [Phonetics and Phonology, general and Danish] (in Danish) (3rd ed.). Copenhagen: Akademisk Forlag. ISBN 978-87-500-3865-8.
- Grønnum, Nina (2008a). "Hvad er det særlige ved dansk som gør det svært at forstå og at udtale for andre?: Første del: enkeltlydene" [What is the peculiarity of Danish that makes it difficult for others to understand and pronounce? First part: Segmentary sounds]. Mål og Mæle. 31 (1): 15–20.
- Grønnum, Nina (2008b). "Hvad er det særlige ved dansk som gør det svært at forstå og at udtale for andre?: Anden del: prosodi" [What is the peculiarity of Danish that makes it difficult for others to understand and pronounce? Second part: Prosody]. Mål og Mæle (in Danish). 31 (2): 19–23.
- Haberland, Hartmut (1994). "Danish". In König, Ekkehard; van der Auwera, Johan (eds.). The Germanic Languages. Routledge Language Family Descriptions. Routledge. pp. 313–349. ISBN 978-0-415-28079-2. JSTOR 4176538.
- Hansen, Erik; Heltoft, Lars (2011). Grammatik over det Danske Sprog (1st ed.). Odense: Syddansk Universitetsforlag. ISBN 9788775330089.
- Hansen, Aage (1943). Stødet i dansk [The Stød in Danish]. De Kongelige Danske Videnskabernes Selskab Historisk-Filologiske Meddelelser (in Danish). Vol. XXIX. Copenhagen: Munksgaard.
- Heltoft, Lars; Preisler, Bent (2007). "Sigtet med en sproglov". Sprogforum (4).
- Herslund, Michael (2001). "The Danish-s genitive: From affix to clitic". Acta Linguistica Hafniensia. 33 (1): 7–18. doi:10.1080/03740463.2001.10412193. S2CID 144030730.
- Herslund, Michael (2002). Danish. München: Lincom Europa. ISBN 3895863963.
- Howe, Stephen (1996). "Old/Middle Danish". The Personal Pronouns in the Germanic Languages: A Study of Personal Pronoun Morphology and Change in the Germanic Languages from the First Records to the Present Day. Walter de Gruyter.
- Jensen, Torben Juel (2011). "Ordstilling i ledsætninger i moderne dansk grammatik". Ny Forskning i Grammatik. 18: 123–150.
- Jacobsen, Birgitte (2003). "Colonial Danish". International Journal of the Sociology of Language (159): 153–164. doi:10.1515/ijsl.2003.004.
- Jespersen, Otto (1906). Modersmålets fonetik [The phonetics of the Mothertongue] (in Danish). Schuboth.
- Karker, Allan (2001). Dansk i tusind år: et omrids af sprogets historie (2 ed.). Copenhagen: C. A. Reitzel.
- Kristiansen, Tore (1998). "The role of standard ideology in the disappearance of the traditional Danish dialects". Folia Linguistica. 32 (1–2): 115–130. doi:10.1515/flin.1998.32.1-2.115. S2CID 143911692.
- Kristiansen, Tore; Jørgensen, Jens Normann (2003). "The sociolinguistics of Danish". International Journal of the Sociology of Language (159): 1. doi:10.1515/ijsl.2003.006.
- Kroman, E (1980). "Debat: Stød-og accentområder og deres oprindelse" [Stød and accent areas and their origins]. Fortid og Nutid, 1. (in Danish).
- Kühl, Karoline; Petersen, Jan Heegård; Hansen, Gert Foget (2020). "The Corpus of American Danish: a language resource of spoken immigrant Danish in North and South America". Language Resources and Evaluation. 54 (3): 831–849. doi:10.1007/s10579-019-09473-5. S2CID 201873487.
- Kyst, Bodil (2008). "Trykgruppens toner i århusiansk regiolekt". Danske Talesprog. 9: 1–64.
- Lundskaer-Nielsen, Tom; Holmes, Philip (2015). Danish: A comprehensive grammar (2nd ed.). Routledge.
- Mikkelsen, Nicholas; Kragelund, Mathias Høyer (2015). "Exaggerated pitch as a story-ending device" (PDF). Skrifter om Samtalegrammatik. 2 (3). ISSN 2445-7256. Archived (PDF) from the original on 20 October 2020.
- Nielsen, Niels Åge (1959). De jyske Dialekter. Copenhagen: Gyldendal.
- Nielsen, Niels Åge (1978). Dansk dialektantologi. Bind 1: Østdansk og ømål. Copenhagen: Hernov.
- Pedersen, Inge Lise (1996). "Sprogsamfundets Historie". In Gregersen, Frans; Holmen, Anne; Kristiansen, Tore; Møller, Erik; Pedersen, Inge Lise; Steensig, Jakob; Ulbæk, lb (eds.). Dansk Sproglære (1 ed.). Dansklærerforeningen.
- Pedersen, Inge Lise (2003). "Traditional dialects of Danish and the de-dialectalization 1900–2000". The Sociolinguistics of Danish. International Journal of the Sociology of Language. pp. 159–9.
- Perridon, Harry (2003). "Dialects and written language in Old Nordic II: Old Danish and Old Swedish". In Bandle, Oskar; Braunmuller, Kurt; Jahr, Ernst Håkon; Karker, Allan; Naumann, Hans-Peter; Teleman, Ulf (eds.). The Nordic Languages: An International Handbook of the History of the North Germanic Languages. Berlin: De Gruyter Brill. doi:10.1515/9783110197051-113. ISBN 3-11-014876-5.
- Prince, John Dyneley (1924). "The Danish Dialect of Bornholm". Proceedings of the American Philosophical Society. 63 (2): 190–207.
- Puggaard, Rasmus (2021). "Modeling regional variation in voice onset time of Jutlandic varieties of Danish". In Van de Velde, Hans; Hilton, Nanna Haug; Knooihuizen, Remco (eds.). Language Variation – European Perspectives VIII. Amsterdam: John Benjains. pp. 80–110. ISBN 9789027259820. Archived from the original on 10 December 2021.
- Rischel, Jørgen (2012). "Danish". Revue Belge de Philologie et d'Histoire. 90 (3): 809–832. doi:10.3406/rbph.2012.8263.
- Steensig, Jakob (2001). Sprog i virkeligheden: bidrag til en interaktionel lingvistik. Aarhus: Aarhus University Press. ISBN 9788772888736.
- Sørensen, V. (2011). Lyd og prosodi i de klassiske danske dialekter [Sound and prosody in the classical Danish dialects] (PDF) (in Danish). Peter Skautrup Centret. Archived from the original (PDF) on 18 May 2015.
- Torp, Arne (2006). "Nordiske sprog i fortid og nutid. Sproglighed og sprogforskelle, sprogfamilier og sprogslægtskab" [Nordic languages in past and present. Language and language diversity, language families and linguistic relatedness]. Nordens Sprog med rødder og fødder [The languages of the Nordic countries with roots and feet] (PDF) (in Danish). Nordens Sprogråd. Archived (PDF) from the original on 4 March 2016.
- Trecca, Fabio; Bleses, Dorthe; Højen, Anders; Madsen, Thomas O; Christiansen, Morten H. (3 January 2020). "When Too Many Vowels Impede Language Processing: An Eye-Tracking Study of Danish-Learning Children". Language and Speech. 63 (4). SAGE Publications: 898–918. doi:10.1177/0023830919893390. ISSN 0023-8309. PMID 31898932. S2CID 147513872.
- Vikør, Lars (2002). "The Nordic language area and the languages in the north of Europe". In Bandle, Oskar; Braunmüller, Kurt; Jahr, Ernst Håkon; Karker, Allan; Naumann, Hans-Peter; Telefon, Ulf (eds.). The Nordic Languages I. Berlin/New York: Walter de Gruyter. doi:10.1515/9783110197051-002. ISBN 9783110197051.
- Waddingham, Anne; Ritter, R. M. (2014). New Hart's rules: the Oxford style guide. Oxford, UK: Oxford University Press. ISBN 9780191649134. OCLC 883571244.
