= Bornholmer Party =

Bornholmer Party Bornholmerpartiet
- Leader: Tonny Borrinjaland
- Founded: 1990s
- Dissolved: c.2021
- Ideology: Bornholmsk preservation Social conservatism Separatism (pre-2015); Autonomy (post-2015)
- Municipal councils: 0 / 2,444

The Bornholmer Party (Danish: Bornholmerpartiet), or better known by its name prior to 2015; the Bornholm's Self-Government Party (Danish: Bornholms Selvstyre parti), is a local political party in Denmark, which seeks to establish autonomy for Bornholm, a small island in the Baltic Sea with a population of slightly below 40,000 people. Founded in the 1990s, the party has seen only minor successes, securing at most a few hundred votes at a time.

The party was founded in the 1990s by Tonny Borrinjaland who led the party until he left in 2021 to join the Danish People's Party.

Location of Bornholm

== History ==
=== Background ===
Bornholm forms part of the ancient Lands of Denmark, many of which were originally petty kingdoms or chiefdoms. It's the official stance of the Bornholm's Self-Government Party that the island was governed by its own petty king during the Viking Age. Regardless, Bornholm ended up hotly contested ground between different Danish factions, and the site of frequent battles. During the 16th century, starting 1525, the island was pawned to Lübeck for 50 years. From 1624 and on it had its own militia, Bornholms Milits. Ceded to Sweden – together with Scania, to which it belonged, along with other provinces such as Bohuslän – in the 1658 Treaty of Roskilde, the island's population threw out the Swedes the same year. As a reward for returning to King Frederick III, Bornholm received a promise never to be ceded again. First occupied by Nazi Germany during the Second World War, Bornholm saw heavy damage during the war, and was also occupied by the Soviet Union until 1946. Since the Second World War, Bornholm has seen a demographic decline, with a large drop in population numbers and birth rates, as well as employment issues.

=== Foundation ===
The party was founded in the 1990s by its longtime leader Tonny Borrinjaland. Borrinjaland claimed that in the 1960s he had been rejected by the girl he loved, and contemplated suicide before going on a years long voyage sailing across the world. On this trip he was terribly homesick and claimed that he found his calling in preserving the Bornholmer dialect and returned to Bornholm in the 1990s founding the party as a vehicle to achieve self-government which Borrinjaland claims is the only way to propagate Bornholmer.

The party has since participated in six municipal elections, gaining 299 votes in the 2009 elections and 190 votes in 2013. The party attributed its decline from 2009 to 2013 due to its boycott of radio and television debates due to the requirement of speaking in Danish.

During the run-up to the 2014 Scottish independence referendum, the party expressed its sympathies for the cause of Scottish independence, and stated that it had a lot to learn from the Scots. Party leader Borrinjaland also pointed to Malta and Singapore as two other models that Bornholm should learn from.

=== Renaming ===
In 2015 then 75 year old party chairman Tonny Borrinjaland changed the name of the party to the Bornholmer Party (Danish: Bornholmerpartiet) to make it easier to remember. During this rebranding the party also dropped its support for stringent independence, instead following a position of autonomy, and a deeper focus on local issues such as the economy. However, despite changing their message, in the 2017 elections the party declined further, earning just 97 votes.

During the 2021 elections Borrinjaland broke from the party and instead ran on the Danish People's Party's list. At 80 years old he was the oldest candidate to stand for the election. The People's Party explained that Borrinjaland was given no concessions to join the party, and that he had dropped most regionalist issues, other than teaching Bornholmsk in schools.

== Policies ==
The proposed Flag of Bornholm supported by Borrinjaland and the party.

Strongly in favour of preserving the endangered Bornholmsk dialect, Borrinjaland has gone as far as to translate the New Testament to the local language. Commenting on his views regarding Bornholmsk, he stated: "Today, it is almost forbidden to speak Bornholmsk in kindergartens and schools on the island. Denmark, with its pure dictatorship, has made sure of this for many years. I think it's scandalous. Therefore, we must make sure that the children learn the language, so that they can at least choose for themselves whether they want to speak Bornholmsk or not" Borrinjaland was also purportedly behind the launch of the flag of Bornholm, a red and green Nordic Cross flag designed by a local painter and published in a local newspaper in 1975. The party supports independence so that a Bornholmsk government can support the Bornholmsk dialect, however, the party has also voiced its support for an autonomous government, like the Faroe Islands. To this end, one of the party's policies is the mandatory education in Bornholmsk up until the 7th grade.

The party seeks to increase the number of municipalities on the island from one to three. The party also seeks to turn Bornholm into a duty free zone.

The party is staunchly in support of the island's fishing industry, which had been its historical backbone. In the 1970s the waters around Bornholm where over fished resulting in a collapse of the industry. The party opposed the construction of a nuclear waste depot on Bornholm in 2013.

== See also ==
- Danish Realm
- Faroese independence movement
- Greenlandic independence
- Icelandic independence movement
- Scania Party
