= Nordic Language Convention =

1987 treaty on linguistic rights

The Nordic Language Convention is a convention of linguistic rights that came into force on 1 March 1987, under the auspices of the Nordic Council. Under the convention, citizens of the Nordic countries have the opportunity to use their native language when interacting with official bodies in other Nordic countries without being liable to any interpretation or translation costs. The Convention covers health care, social security, tax, school, and employment authorities, the police and courts. The languages included are Swedish, Danish, Norwegian, Finnish and Icelandic.

The convention is not very well known and is mostly a recommendation. The countries have committed themselves to providing services in various languages, but citizens have no absolute rights except for criminal and court matters. The Convention does not automatically require authorities to provide services in another language but a citizen must demand an interpreter. Civil servants in official institutions are often unaware of the regulations on interpreting and translating and neglect to provide these services when requested. Furthermore, the convention excludes minority languages, like Faroese, Kalaallisut, Romany and Sami, and immigrant languages. English has also assumed an increasingly prominent role in interactions between Nordic citizens.

== See also ==
- Nordic Council
- Linguistic rights
