= Insular Danish =

Group of dialects of Danish

Insular Danish (Danish: Ømål) are the traditional Danish dialects spoken on the islands of Zealand, Langeland, Funen, Falster, Lolland, and Møn. They are recorded in the Dictionary of Danish Insular Dialects (Ømålsordbogen) which has been collected since the 1920s, and published in biannual volumes since 1992. There are significant differences between the different insular varieties, but they also share a number of features. A major difference between Modern Danish and the traditional insular dialects is that some of them lack the stød but kept the tonal accent. Also, they kept three noun genders.

== Genders ==
Insular Danish kept three grammatical genders, but most other Danish varieties reduced the gender system to two. By 1900, Zealand insular dialects had been reduced to two genders under the influence from the standard language, but other varieties like Funen dialect had not.

== Personal pronouns ==
The old Insular or Funen dialect could also use personal pronouns in certain cases, particularly to refer to animals. A classic example in traditional Funen dialect is the sentence Katti, han får unger (literally, The cat, he is having kittens). The cat is masculine in gender and so referred to as han ("he") even if it is a female cat.
