= Flag of Bornholm =

Unofficial flag of the Danish island of Bornholm

Flag of Bornholm

Alternate version of the flag, with white fimbriation

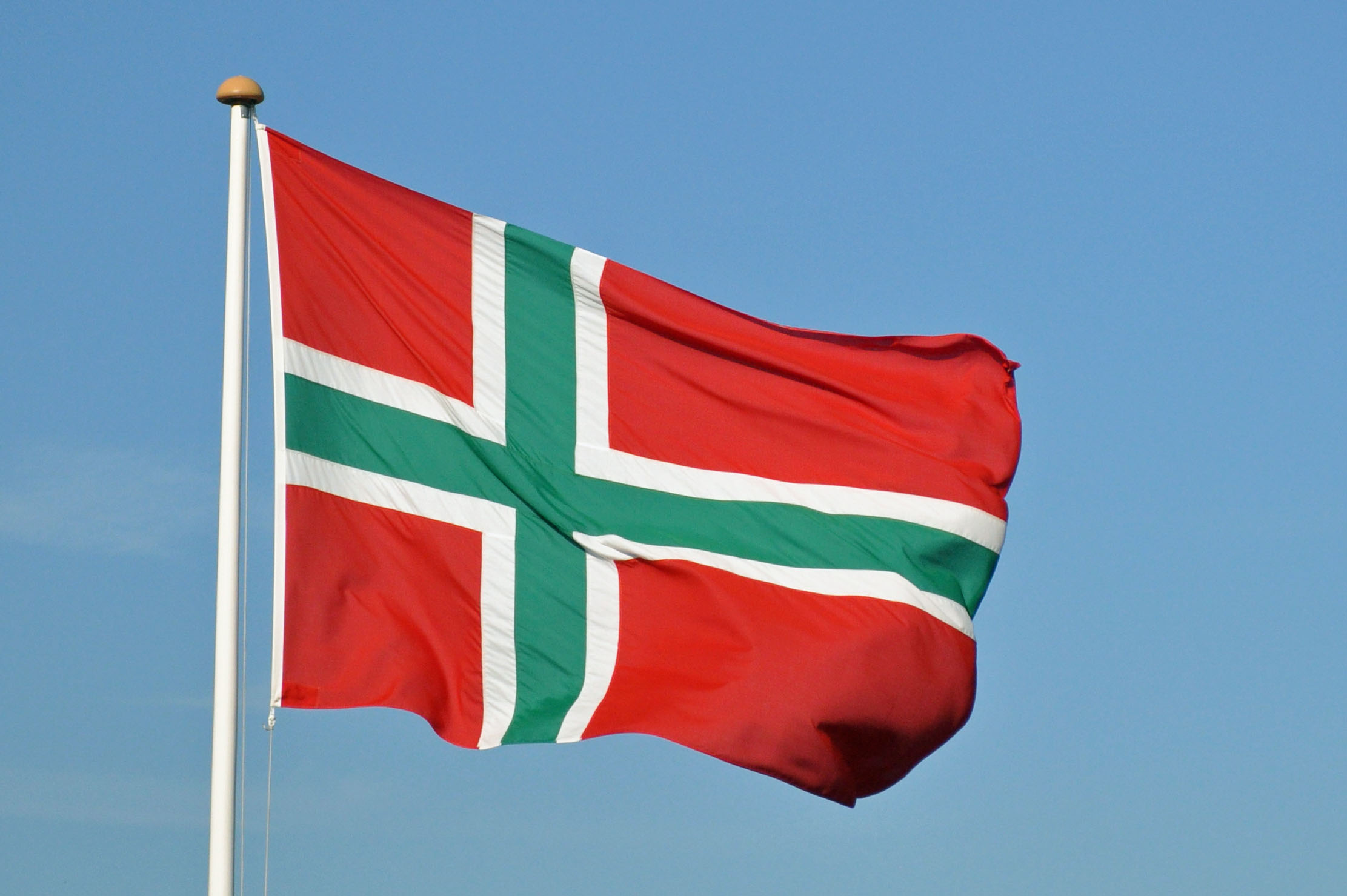
Bornholmsflaget in the wind

The flag of Bornholm is the unofficial flag of the Danish island Bornholm, seen as a de facto symbol of the municipality. It was designed in the mid-1970s by local painter Bent Kaas, and is the flag of Bornholm most commonly used on the island. It is the Danish flag, but with a green Nordic cross in the centre instead of white. The green is said to symbolize the natural greenery of the island. The other variant resembles Norway's flag, except replacing the blue inner cross with green.

The flag has no known historical foundation. Its uses are primarily: In a tourism context on various products (which are not normally produced on Bornholm); by military units while on exercise in Denmark and on foreign missions; and by mainly German sailors visiting Bornholm. Despite its general appreciation, the flag is not officially recognized, though many people still use it, for example on vehicles.

While there is no official flag for Bornholm, the Bornholm Municipality, the former County of Bornholm, as well as the now defunct Danish regiment - the Bornholms Værn - had a coat of arms. It showed a depiction of a golden sea serpent, which can also be called a griffin, or a cockatrice against a red background.

The defunct Bornholmer Party, which advocated for both secession from Denmark, and the elevation of Bornholm to an autonomous region similar to the Faroe Islands, had called for the flag to be made the official flag of either the independent or autonomous Bornholm entity.
