= Bornholm dialect =

Dialect of Danish

Bornholmsk
- Native to: Denmark
- Region: Bornholm
- Language family: Indo-European: Germanic; Northwest Germanic?; North Germanic; East Scandinavian; Danish; East Danish; Bornholmsk

Language codes
- ISO 639-3: –
- Glottolog: born1251
- IETF: da-bornholm

Bornholmsk is an East Danish dialect spoken on the island of Bornholm in the Baltic Sea. It was originally part of the East Danish dialect continuum, which includes the dialects of southern Sweden, but became isolated in the Danish dialect landscape after 1658, when Sweden annexed the eastern Danish provinces of Scania (Skåne), Halland and Blekinge.

The language is more generally spoken than written, despite the existence of several Bornholmsk–Danish dictionaries and a regular Bornholmsk article in the local newspaper. Even words that are never used in Standard Danish are spelled according to the standard orthography.

The dialect is endangered, as the inhabitants of Bornholm have been shifting to standard Danish over the past century. "Bevar Bornholmsk" is an organization whose purpose is to preserve Bornholmsk. Its main organization is KulturBornholm, the editor of books with CDs with the text in Bornholmsk. The Bornholm's Self-Government Party was founded in the 1990s with the express goal of preserving the dialect, which it considers a separate language from Danish, which they believe can only be achieved through initially independence, and later, self government.

== Dialects ==
The small island has only about 40,000 inhabitants, yet the language is divided into five main dialects, not counting standard Danish. As an example, "eye" would be spelled iva in some regions, but elsewhere it would be øja, which is quite close to the Danish word øje and Scanian "öja-öjen".

The northern part of the island would have more influence by Swedish than the rest of the island, due to the relatively large number of Swedish immigrants on those shores closest to Sweden. The differences are actually large enough so that the north-Bornholm dialect is called Allinge-svensk ("Allinge-Swedish") in Danish – Âlinga-svænsk in Bornholmsk. However, most Swedish immigrants hailed from the Scanian provinces and spoke dialects that derived from East Danish.

== Relationship to Danish and Swedish ==
Like in the case of the closely related Scanian dialect spoken in Southern Sweden, the question whether the dialect is Danish or Swedish cannot be separated from the political and ideological burden attached to language as an ethnic marker. Therefore, Danes from other parts of the country may accuse people from Bornholm of speaking Swedish as a kind of insult (using derogatory nicknames like reservesvensker, "auxiliary Swede").

From a linguistic point of view, the Scandinavian languages form a continuum, and the dialects of Skåne, Blekinge, Halland and Bornholm are a natural bridge between "sjællandsk" (the dialects of Zealand) and "götamål" (the dialects of Götaland). One may define "Danish" and Swedish" in two different ways:

1. historically: Danish is the part of the dialect continuum that has certain sound changes in common like the weakening of plosives (see below) or certain innovations in the vocabulary.
2. sociolinguistically: Danish is the part of the dialect continuum that has Standard Danish as its written standard (Dachsprache).

According to both criteria, Bornholmsk is indeed a Danish dialect (whereas modern Scanian would be Swedish according to the second one, although this was not so until 1680 when Swedish first became the language of the authorities and church in Scania).

Bornholmsk has indeed many phonetical features in common with Swedish (most of them archaisms, though, which are irrelevant for the classification of the dialect). Yet, in most cases where the vocabularies of Swedish and Danish differ, Bornholmsk stands with Danish. This is also reflected in its IETF BCP 47 language tag, da-bornholm.

== Phonology ==
=== Sound system ===
An official standardised orthography of Bornholmsk does not exist since Standard Danish is taught in schools and is the language of all public communication. However, dialect texts use a simplified phonetical alphabet (invented by K.J. Lyngby in the 19th century and also employed in Espersen's dictionary of Bornholmsk):

Consonants
	Labial	Labiodental	Dental	Alveolar	Alveolo-palatal	Velar	Uvular	Glottal
Plosives	p [pʰ] b [b]		t [tʰ] d [d]		ḱ (kj) [tɕ] ǵ (gj) [dʑ]	k [kʰ] g [ɡ]		
Fricatives		f [f] v [v]	t [θ] d [ð]	s [s] z [z]	ś (sj) [ʃ] ź (zj) [ʒ]		r [ʁ]	h [h]
Liquids				l [l]	ĺ (lj / jl / jlj) [ʎ]			
Nasals	m [m]		n [n]		ń (nj / jn / jnj) [ɲ]	ng [ŋ]		
Approximants	w [w]				j [j]			

Vowels
	Front		Central	Back	
	unrounded	rounded	Central	unrounded	rounded
Close vowel	i [iː] i [i]	y [yː] y [y]			u [uː, uːʊ] u [u]
Close-mid vowel	e [eː, eːə] e [e]	ø [ø]			o [oː, oːʊ] o [o]
Mid vowel			e [ə]		
Open-mid vowel	æ [ɛː] æ [ɛ]	ö [œː]			å [ɔː] å [ɔ]
Open vowel	a [aː] a [a]			â [ɑː] â [ɑ]	

A stressed syllable always contains either a long vowel or a long consonant (like in Swedish, but unlike Standard Danish, where there are no long consonants). Bornholmsk does not have the stød characteristic of most varieties of Danish, but on the other hand, it does not have the musical accent characteristic of Swedish and Norwegian either.

=== Phonetic development ===
In the list, there is special emphasis on the developments that set Bornholmsk apart from Standard Danish. For the sake of convenience, Old Norse (i.e. Old Icelandic) forms have been quoted instead of Old Danish forms.

1. postvocalic p > v [v]: kaupa "buy" > kjøvva [ˈtɕøvːa] (SD købe [ˈkʰøːbə], colloquial and in most dialects [ˈkʰøːʊ])
2. postvocalic f > w or, seldom, v: grafa > grawa [ˈɡʁaːwa] (SD grave [ˈɡʁɑːʊ]), lefa "live" > lewa [ˈleːwa] (SD leve [ˈleːʊ])
3. w > v, but w after s, k: vatn "water" > vann [ˈvanː] (SD vand [ˈʋænˀ]), but sverja "swear" > swæra [ˈswɛːʁa] (SD sværge [ˈsʋaːʊ]), kvenna "woman" > kwinnja [ˈkwiɲːa] (SD kvinde [ˈkʰʋenə]).
4. postvocalic t > d [d]. In some words, we have [ð], though, and increasingly so due to the influence from Standard Danish: bīta "bite" > bida [ˈbiːda] (SD bide [ˈbiːð̩]).
5. postvocalic ð > -, sometimes (especially in unstressed syllables and learned words) ð: nauð "need" > nö [ˈnœː] (SD nød [ˈnøðˀ]), but mánaðr "month" > månad (SD måned [ˈmɔːnð̩])
6. postvocalic k > g after back-tongue-vowels. ēk, ek, ik, īk > æj or (before t, s) aj: kaka "cake" > kâga [ˈkʰɑːɡa] (SD kage [ˈkʰæːɪ, ˈkʰæːæ]); eik "oak" > æj [ˈɛːj] (SD eg [ˈeːˀɪ̯]), lík "corpse" > læj [ˈlɛːj] (SD lig [ˈliːˀ]), seks "six" > sajs [ˈsaːjs] (SD seks [ˈsɛɡs])
7. postvocalic g > w after back-tongue vowels and j after front-tongue vowels: fogl > fâwl [ˈfɑːwl] (SD fugl [ˈfuːˀl]), lagr "low" > lâwer [ˈlɑːwəʁ] (SD lav [ˈlæʊ̯ˀ]), segja "say" > saja [ˈsaːja] (SD sige [ˈsiːi]), vegr "way" > vaj [ˈvaːj] (SD vej [ˈʋajˀ])
8. k, g > kj, dj [tɕ, dʑ] before and after front-tongue vowels. tj and sj > kj [tɕ] and sj [ʃ]: keyra "run (a car)" > kjöra [ˈtɕœːʁa] (SD køre [ˈkʰøːɐ]), gess "geese" > gjæss [ˈdʑɛsː] (SD gæs [ˈɡɛs]), fekk "got" > fikj [ˈfitɕ] (SD fik [ˈfeɡ]), egg "egg" > ægj [ˈɛdʑ] (SD æg [ˈɛːˀɡ]).
9. nn > nnj [ɲː] and nd > nn or (after i, y, u) nnj [ɲː]: þynnr "thin" > tynnjer [ˈtʰyɲːəʁ] (SD tynd [ˈtˢønˀ]), binda "bind" > binnja [ˈbiɲːa] (SD binde [ˈbenə]), but land "land" > lann [ˈlanː] (SD land [ˈlænˀ]).
10. ll, ld > llj [ʎː]: oll "wool" > ullj [ˈuʎː] (SD uld [ˈulˀ]), kaldr "cold" > kålljer [ˈkʰɔʎːəʁ] (SD kold [ˈkʰʌlˀ])
11. ŋ > nnj [ɲː] after e and sometimes i, y: lengi > lænnje [ˈlɛɲːə] (SD længe [ˈlɛŋə]), þenkja, þenkti "think, thought" > tænjkja, tænjte [ˈtʰɛːɲtɕa, ˈtʰɛːɲtʰə] (SD tænke, tænkte [ˈtˢɛŋɡə, ˈtˢɛŋdə])
12. iū > y or, word-initially and after t, jy: ljós "light" > lyz [ˈlyːz] (SD lys [ˈlyːˀs]), jól "Christmas" > jyl [ˈjyːl] (SD jul [ˈjuːˀl]), þjórr "bull" > kjyr [ˈtɕyːʁ] (SD tyr [ˈtˢyɐ̯ˀ])
13. y, ø > i, e, æ before w: daufr "deaf" > dæwer [ˈdɛːwəʁ] (SD døv [ˈdøʊ̯ˀ]), tjogu "twenty" > tjuge > kjive [ˈtɕiːvə] (SD tyve [ˈtˢyːʊ])
14. unstressed a > a (like Swedish, but unlike the other Danish dialects): kalla "call" > kalja [ˈkʰaːʎa] (SD kalde [ˈkʰælə]), sumarr "summer" > såmmar [ˈsɔmːaʁ] (SD sommer [ˈsʌmɐ])
15. long ō is preserved in closed syllables: bóndi "farmer" > bone [ˈboːnə] (SD bonde [ˈb̥ɔnə]), similarly hús > hōs "at (somebody)" > hos [hoːs] (SD hos [hɔs])
16. ow, ōw, uw, ūw > âw [ɑw]: dúfa "dove" > dâwwa [ˈdɑwːa] (SD due [ˈduːu]), skógr > skâww [ˈskɑwː] (SD skov [ˈsɡʌʊ̯ˀ]), sofa "sleep" > sâwwa [ˈsɑʊːa] (SD sove [ˈsɒːʊ])

== Morphology ==
=== Nominal inflection ===
Bornholmsk has retained three distinct grammatical genders, like Icelandic or Norwegian, and unlike standard Danish or Swedish. The gender inflection exists not only in the definite article (like in Norwegian and certain Danish dialects), but also in the adjectives:

Born- holmsk	indefinite		definite		
Born- holmsk	without adjective	with adjective	without adjective	with adjective	
Singular
Masculine	inj hæst	inj go-er hæst	hæst-inj	denj goa hæst-inj	"(good) horse"
Feminine	en sâg	en go sâg	sâg-en	den go-a sâg-en	"(good) case / thing"
Neuter	et huz	et go-t huz	huz-ed	de go-a huz-ed	"(good) house"
Plural
Masculine	hæsta	go-a hæsta	hæsta-na	di go-e hæsta-na	"(good) horses"
Feminine	sâger	go-a sâger	sâgar-na	di go-e sâgar-na	"(good) cases / things"
Neuter	huz	go-a huz	huz-en	di go-e huz-en	"(good) houses"

Standard Danish	indefinite		definite		
Standard Danish	without adjective	with adjective	without adjective	with adjective	
Singular
Masculine	en hest	en god hest	hest-en	den god-e hest	"(good) horse"
Feminine	en sag	en god sag	sag-en	den god-e sag	"(good) case / thing"
Neuter	et hus	et god-t hus	hus-et	det god-e hus	"(good) house"
Plural
Masculine	heste	god-e heste	heste-ne	de god-e heste	"(good) horses"
Feminine	sager	god-e sager	sager-ne	de god-e sager	"(good) cases / things"
Neuter	huse	god-e huse	huse-ne	de god-e huse	"(good) houses"

In adjectives, -er is the old ending of the masculine nominative still extant in German (-er), Icelandic (-ur) and Faroese (-ur), but lost in the other Scandinavian dialects (except for certain old phrases like Danish en ungersvend, originally en unger svend, "a young fellow"). In Bornholmsk, it is used in all cases (since the dialect has not retained the Old Danish case flexion).

Masculine nouns normally have the plural ending -a - and this is also the case when the singular ends in a vowel (where Standard Danish would have -er), e.g. skâwwa "woods" (sg. skâww), tima "hours" (sg. tima). Feminine nouns have -er. Neuter nouns have zero ending, and the definite article of the neuter plural is -en, e.g. huz "houses", huzen "the houses" (sg. huz)

=== Pronouns ===
Bornholmsk has an enclitic form of the personal pronoun that is unknown in the other Danish dialects, namely masculine -iń "him" and feminine -na "her". They originate from the old accusatives hann and hana still used in Icelandic, whereas the Scandinavian languages, apart from spoken Swedish in the Mälaren Valley, normally use the old dative form for the oblique case (Danish ham, hende, Swedish honom, henne). These enclitic forms also occur in spoken Norwegian, where -n is masculine and -a is feminine. Colloquial and dialectal Swedish has them as well: jag har sett'n/sett'na "I have seen him/her".

=== Verbal conjugation ===
Until the 20th century, Bornholmsk inflected the verbs in number, e.g. jâ bińńer "I bind" ~ vi bińńa "we bind", jâ bânt "I bound" ~ vi bonne "we bound". Spoken Danish had already given this inflection up in the 18th century, even though it was still practiced in the literary language until it was officially cancelled in 1900 (jeg binder ~ vi binde).

Bornholmsk also has special endings for the 2nd person, when a pronoun follows immediately after the ending, namely -st in the singular and -en in the plural:

såstu-na "did you see her" (SD så du hende)
gån i "are you going" (SD går I)
varren så goa "here you are" (SD vær så god, værsgo; lit. "be so good/kind")

== Text samples ==
=== Literature ===
Beginning of a poem printed in Espersen's Bornholmsk Ordbog.

Bornholmsk	Danish	English
God awtan, liden Elna, gods fredd, God awtan, min deilia rosa! Ad gubbajn hajn vill freia, jâ vedd; Men toustuijn, vastu jo tosa. Te öfröl ded lakkar well snarara, du, En konna, - ded bler nokk for sijlla; Men jâ går å stjärnar på piblana nu, Forr jâ e på nå nu så vijlla. Hvad, liden Elna, Hvad, min deilia rosa?	God aften, lille Elna, guds fred, God aften, min dejlige rose! At gubben vil fri, ved jeg; Men tog du ham, var du jo en tosse. Til gravøl lakker det nok snarere, du; En kone - det bliver nok for silde; Men jeg går og kigger på pigerne nu, For nu er jeg næsten i stand dertil (til at gifte mig). Hvad, lille Elna, Hvad, min dejlige rose?	Good evening, little Elna, God's peace! Good evening my beautiful rose! That the old man will court you I know, But if you took him, you would be a foolish lass. To funeral ale it is drawing near (for him), do you see? A wife-it is much too late (for that), But I am going to peep at the girls now, For I am almost ready (to marry). What, little Elna! What my beautiful rose!

=== Spoken language ===
Interview with a native speaker from Ibsker. The informant was born in 1906, and the text was recorded in 1973.:

Bornholmsk	Danish	English
ˈlɛːjˌsteːniɲ ... ˈdeː sɔn iɲ ˈstoːʁ ˈflɑːðɐ ˈsteːn dɛɲ e ˈtʰʁeː ˈɡɔŋːa sɔ ˈstoːʁ sɔm ˈboːʁəð ˈhɛːʁ vɛl - ɔ dɛɲ ˈlidʑəʁ veːʁ ˈvɛːɲ sɔm ˈkʰɔmːəʁ ɔwːəʁ fʁɔ ˈkʰliːnby ɔ ɡɔʁ ˈɔwːəʁ imoð ˈkʰoːdɑːl tʰeː - ɔ dɛːʁ ˈdʑikʰ jo ˈalsɔ ˈsawnəð i ˈɡamla ˈdɑː - fɔʁ ˈkʰliːnbyˌboːʁna di ˈhøːʁə meː tʰe ˈibskəʁ ˈsɔwn ɔ ˈibskəʁ ˈtɕɛʁkʰə sɔ ˈnɔʁ di ˈdœː di ˈskʰolːe hɑː ˈbɔːʁan tʰe ˈibskəʁ sɔ ˈbɑːʁ di ˈdɛɲ pʰɔ ˈsɔn e ˈbɛːʁiɲə - ɔ sɔ ˈviːlaða di ˈdɛːʁ pʰɔ - pʰɔ ˈlɛːjˌsteːniɲ - ɔ sɔ ˈhɑːð di jo ˈmɑːð i ˈkʰɔʁːiɲ - ˈbʁɛɲevinsˌflaskəʁ ˈmeː sɛˈfølːi - di ˈskʰolːə ˈhɑ dɔm en ˈsyːpʰ ɔ ˈstɔʁtɕa dɔm ˈpʰɔː ɔ sɔ ˈvɑːŋkʰaðː di ˈviːðəʁa fɔʁ di ˈmɔtʰːe jo ˈentʰə ˈsɛtʰːa ˈtɕiːstan pʰɔ ˈjoːʁən: mæŋ kʰu jo ˈtʰʁoːˀ æ d̥i ˈɔnʌˌjoɐ̯ˀd̥isɡ̊ə hʌl ˈtˢe pʰɔ ˈsʌn ˈsd̥ɛːð̞ɐ ...; jaː ˈsɔ - de ˈdʑoːʁə di - di ˈɡamla, di ˈtʰʁoːdə jo pʰɔ ˈde dɛʁ sɔm, ja ˈde ˈdʑoːʁə di - ɔ ˈde - ˈʁakʰːaʁiɲ haɲ ˈboːdə jo ˈaltʰi dɛʁˈuːdə - de ˈva jo ˈhanːəm sɔm ˈflɔːðə di ˈsɛːlˌdœː ˈkʰʁaːjtʰuʁn ɔ ˈslajtʰaða ˈhɛsta ɔ ˈsɑːn ˈnɑːð - haɲ ˈmɔtʰːe jo ˈentʰə ˈboː pʰɔ ˈiɲmaːʁkʰən haɲ ˈskʰolːə ˈboː pʰɔ ˈløŋiɲ - haɲ ˈhaðːə ˈsɔnːən ˈɡamːəl ˈløŋɡˌhyːtʰa dɛːʁˈuːde - ˈfɑʁ haɲ kʰuɲe ˈhɑwsa-əð ˈsɑː haɲ - ˈvestə ˈvɔʁ haɲ ˈhaðːe ˈboːtʰ - ɔ - ˈsɔ nɔʁ haɲ ˈdʑikʰ tʰe ˈaltʰəʁs sɔ ˈmɔtʰːə haɲ ˈentʰə ˈdʁekʰːa - fɔ ˈdɛɲ ˈɡɔŋiɲ ˈdʁɔkʰ di jo idɔː ˈsamːa ˈbɛːɡəʁəð ˈaʎːe ˈjo mɛn ˈhaːɲ skʰolːə ˈdʁekʰːa uːð a ˈfoːdiɲ pʰɔ ˈbɛːɡəʁəð - haɲ mɔtʰːə ˈentʰə ˈdʁekʰːa pʰɔ ˈde dɛːʁ haɲ vaː jo ... ˈuˌʁɛːˀn ... ˈja haɲ va ˈuˌʁeːn ˈja - sɔ ˈnɑːʁ haɲ ˈkʰɔm tʰe ˈswɑːnikʰa iɲ ˈɡɔŋɡ ɔ skʰolːe ˈhanla - ˈsɔ - ɔ ˈdɛɲ ˈɡɔŋɡiɲ ˈfitɕ di jo ˈdʑɛʁn ˈaltʰi en ˈsnapʰs nɔʁ di kʰɔm ˈiɲ tʰe ˈtɕøˌmaːɲ ɔ skʰulːe ˈhanla ˈjoː - sɔ ˈkʰɔm jo ˈdɛɲ dɛːʁ - ˈsɔn - ˈʁakʰːaʁiɲ ˈɑw ja - ɔ sɔ - ˈva di ʃɛːɲtʰe jo bɑːʁa i de ˈsamːa ˈɡlɑːzəð tʰe ˈaʎːəsamːəna ˈjoː - ɔ sɔ - haːɲ fitɕ jo en ˈsyːpʰ ɔ dɔ skʰolːə dɛɲ ˈnɛsta ˈhɑː - ˈdɛfɔ sɑ haɲ ˈsɔː ˈjɑ skʰal vɛl fɔ ˈdɛːwliɲ ˈitɕe ˈdʁekʰːa idɔ ˈde ˈɡlɑːzeð sɔm ˈhaɲ ha ˈdʁɔkʰːəð iˈdɔː	Ligstenen ... det er sådan en stor, flad sten, den er tre gange så stor som bordet her, vel. Og den ligger ved vejen som kommer ovre fra Klinteby og går over imod Kodal til. Og der gik jo altså sagnet i gamle dage - for Klintebyboerne, de hørte med til Ibsker sogn og Ibsker Kirke, så når de døde, de skulle blive båret til Ibsker, så bar de den på sådan en bærer. Og så hvilede de dér på - på Ligstenen. Og så havde de jo mad i kurven, brændevinsflasker med, selvfølgelig. De skulle jo have sig en slurk at styrke sig på. Og så vandrede de videre, for de måtte jo ikke sætte kisten på jorden. Man kunne jo tro at de underjordiske holdt til på de steder... Ja - det gjorde de, de gamle troede på det der, som - ja det gjorde de. Og det – rakkeren, han boede jo altid derude. Det var jo ham som flåede de selvdøde kreaturer og slagtede heste og sådan noget - han måtte jo ikke bo på indmarken, han skulle bo på lyngen. Han havde sådan en gammel lynghytte derude. Far, han kunne huske det, sagde han - vidste hvor han havde boet. Og - så når han gik til alters, så måtte han ikke drikke - for den gangen drak de jo af samme bæger, alle sammen, men han skulle drikke af foden på bægeret - han måtte ikke drikke på det der, han var jo ... uren ... ja, han var uren, ja. da han kom til Svaneke en gang og skulle handle - så - og dengang fik de jo gerne altid en snaps når de kom ind til købmanden og skulle handle. Så kom der jo den der - sådan rakker og ja - og så - hvad, de skænkede jo bare i det samme glas til alle sammen. Og så - han fik jo en slurk, og så skulle den næste have. Derfor sagde han så: "Jeg skal fandme ikke drikke af det glas som han har drukket af."	The corpse stone ... it is like a large, flat stone, three times this table, I gather. And it lies on the road that comes from Klinteby and goes to Kodal. Well, there was this legend in old days – you know, the people of Klinteby used to belong to the parish of Ibsker and the church of Ibsker, so when the dead were going to be carried to Ibsker, they would carry it on such a carrier. And they would rest there on the Corpse Stone. And then they would have food in the basket – bottles of snaps. of course- After all, they would need a sip to strengthen themselves. And then, they would carry on, for they weren't supposed to set the coffin on the ground. You'd think, the people of the underground would live in such places... Yes, they did, the old ones believed in that stuff, yes, they did. And it – the horse butcher, he always lived there, you know. He was the one that skinned the self-dead cattle and butchered horses and stuff. He wasn't supposed to live in the in-field, you know, he had to live on the heath. He had like an old heath hut out there. Dad, he remembered it, he said, knew where he had lived. And – when he went to the communion, he wasn't supposed to drink – for at that time, they all drank from the same cup, you know, but he had to drink from the foot of the cup – he wasn't supposed to drink on it, he was, you know ... unclean... yes, he was unclean, he was. So once he came to Svaneke and went shopping – you know, they would always take a little snaps when they visited the grocer at that time. So, this, this butcher came and, then, what happened? They poured in the same glass for everybody, you know. And he had a sip, and then the next was supposed to drink. So, he said: "Damn it, I won't drink from that glass he drank from."
