= Minna Skafte Jensen =

Danish philologist (born 1937)

Minna Skafte Jensen (born 19 May 1937) is a Danish philologist.

== Career ==
She was born in Ryde as a daughter of priest Ankiær Hareskov (1903–44) and politician Meta Hjemdal (1912–2005). Spurned by her mother, she commenced studies of classical philology at the University of Copenhagen in 1956. She spent one semester at the University of Lund, before graduating with the cand.mag. degree in 1963. She then studied the Greek epic tradition in Copenhagen, Glasgow and Cambridge to graduate with the thesis Hovedlinier i de sidste årtiers Homerforskning, a study of the modern research on Homer.

She was a lecturer at the University of Copenhagen from 1969. From 1974 she had a research grant to work with Androkli Kostallari and the Academy of Sciences of Albania. Following her doctoral dissertation The Homeric Question and the Oral-Formulaic Theory, she gradually established herself among the world's leading Homeric researchers. She became the first female professor in classical philology in Denmark when assuming this position at the University of Odense in 1993.

In general literary history, she contributed to the multi-volume works Dansk litteraturhistorie and Verdens litteraturhistorie, also leading to the publishing of A History of Nordic Neo-Latin Literature (1995). She sat on the editorial board of the journals Oral Tradition and Classica et Mediaevalia. She was inducted into the Danish Academy of Science and the Norwegian Academy of Science and Letters.

== Personal life ==
Politically, Minna Skafte Jensen aligned with communist Albania after working there, and was a board member of the Denmark–Albania Friendship Society until its dissolution in 1991. She was a member of the Socialist People's Party in the early 1970s. She was then a sympathizer of the Communist Workers Party (founded in 1976) and ultimately a member from 1981 of the Communist Party of Denmark/Marxist–Leninists (founded 1978).

From 1959 to 1973 she was married to Jørgen Skafte Jensen. They had two daughters in the 1960s, and she also had a son in 1974.
