= East Danish =

Group of dialects of Danish

- Native to: Denmark
- Language family: Indo-European: Germanic; North Germanic; East Scandinavian; Danish; East Danish
- Dialects: Bornholmsk; Skånska (historically)

Language codes
- ISO 639-3: None (mis)
- Glottolog: scan1238

East Danish refers to dialects of the Danish language spoken in Bornholm (Bornholmsk dialect) in Denmark and historically also spoken in Blekinge, Halland and Skåne (Scanian dialect), collectively known as East Denmark before 1658. After Scania, Halland and Blekinge were annexed by Sweden under the Treaty of Roskilde, the dialects have been under Swedish influence. The residents now speak regionally influenced Standard Swedish. The old original dialects are considered to have been part of the East Danish dialect group by many researchers.
