= Gøtudanskt accent =

Variety of Danish

Gøtudanskt
- Dano-Faroese
- Region: Faroe Islands
- Ethnicity: Faroe Islanders
- Language family: Indo-European: Germanic; North Germanic; East Scandinavian; Danish; Gøtudanskt
- Early forms: Old Norse: Old East Norse; Early Old Danish; Late Old Danish
- Writing system: Danish alphabet

Language codes
- ISO 639-3: –
- IETF: da-FO

Gøtudanskt (pronounced [ˈkøːʰtʊtaŋ̊kst], also Dano-Faroese) is a variety of Danish spoken in the Faroe Islands by Faroe Islanders. Its pronunciation is influenced by Faroese, the usual native language of Gøtudanskt speakers.

Gøtudanskt arose as a product of compulsory Danish language instruction in education in the Faroe Islands; its speakers routinely code-switch between Faroese and Gøtudanskt depending on their interlocutor's knowledge of Faroese.

== Etymology ==
Poulsen (1993) attributes the term Gøtudanskt to a teacher (1850–1930) from the small village of (Norðra)gøta on Eysturoy who spoke Danish with a pronounced accent, representing many of the common features of Gøtudanskt. Most people agree with this explanation. The term has alternatively been interpreted as "street Danish" based on the similarity between gøtu- and Danish gade 'street', but Poulsen criticizes these as unlikely.

== Definition ==
The term has been used to refer to different varieties in the literature, besides being used as a folk notion. Mitchinson (2012) considers Faroese Print-Danish as differing only from Standard Danish in terms of pronunciation, while Faroe-Danish furthermore incorporates elements of Faroese lexicon and grammar. The amount of Faroese influence differs between individuals.

== Examples ==
An example of Gøtudanskt is the expression "Væk af vejen! Konge skrejen." ‘Away from the road! The king is sledding’. The word skrejen comes from the Faroese verb skreiða ‘to sled’, but is not in use in Danish. Another example is De store for flesen, de kan brække traver, where for flesen corresponds to Faroese fyri flesini 'outside the skerry' and traver to Faroese tráður fishing rods, ‘The big ones (i.e. coalfish) outside the skerry can break fishing rods’.

The traditional Faroese way of singing hymns (the Kingo song) uses Gøtudanskt. The metal band Týr's songs "Ramund Hin Unge" on the album Eric the Red and "Sinklars vísa" on the album Land are also sung in Gøtudanskt.
