= South Jutlandic =

Dialect of Danish

- synnejysk
- Native to: Denmark
- Region: Southern Jutland, to be more precise in Northern Schleswig (Denmark) and Southern Schleswig (Germany).
- Language family: Indo-European: Germanic; North Germanic; East Scandinavian; Danish; Jutlandic; South Jutlandic
- Dialects: Angel Danish †

Language codes
- ISO 639-3: –
- Glottolog: None
- IETF: da-synnejyl
- South Jutlandic is classified as Definitely Endangered by the UNESCO Atlas of the World's Languages in Danger (2010)

South Jutlandic or South Jutish (synnejysk; Danish: sønderjysk; German: Südjütisch or Plattdänisch) is a dialect of the Danish language. South Jutlandic is spoken in Southern Jutland (Sønderjylland; also called Schleswig or Slesvig) on both sides of the border between Denmark and Germany.

Variants of the dialect include Western and Eastern South Jutlandic (including Alsisk). The former variant in Angeln (Danish: Angel) and Schwansen (Svansø) was known as Angel Danish.

The other dialects classified as belonging to the Jutlandic or Jutish (Jysk) group of dialects are West, East, and North Jutlandic.

== Usage ==
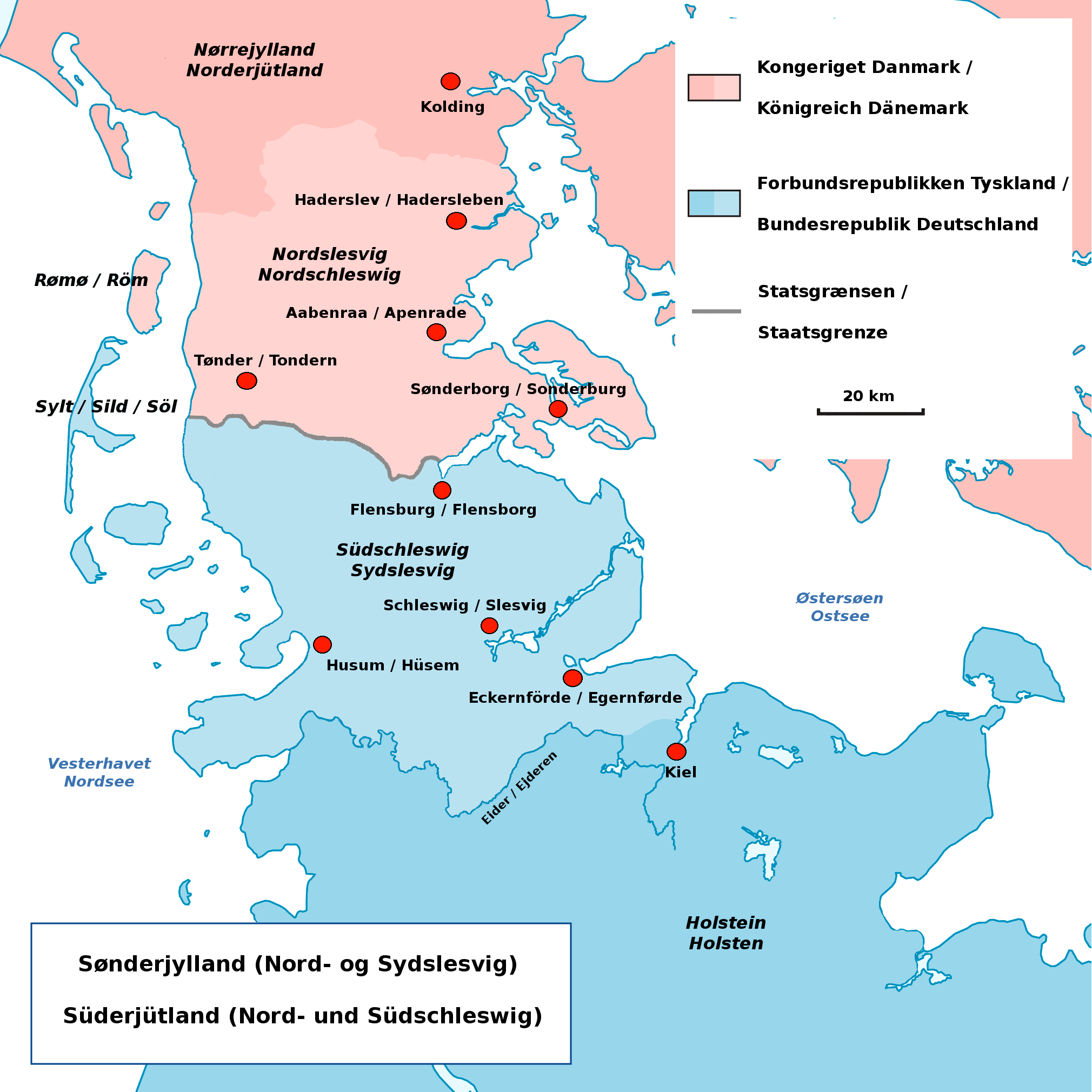
Map of Northern and Southern Schleswig (Southern Jutland)

=== Northern Slesvig ===
Many older people will still speak a distinct South Jutlandic dialect, both in towns and rural areas. Younger people and children are more likely to use a dialect-tinted version of Standard Danish, but everything ranging from relatively pure dialect to Standard Danish can be found. Many are able to switch between both varieties.

A renewed popular interest in preserving the South Jutlandic dialect has been seen in recent years. This revival has been fuelled by the works of several local artists and authors as well as Æ Synnejysk Forening, a society working for the promotion of the dialect.

Several schools now offer the dialect as an optional subject, but Rigsdansk, the official Danish, remains a compulsory subject.

Members of the South Jutlandic minority on the German side of the border tend to emphasize their South Jutlandic identity. Many members of this minority are in one way or another connected with agriculture, the dialect being more prevalent in rural communities. The German minority usually speak South Jutlandic with each other and with Danish-minded people alike, but prefer German for writing and official occasions such as meetings. Standard Danish is mastered as well and is taught in schools, along with Standard German.

=== Southern Slesvig ===
South Jutlandic is still spoken to some degree in villages up to about 15 km south of the Danish-German border, but hardly in the major city of Flensburg, where the Danish speakers speak Standard Danish. Most people will be able to speak or understand Low German and sometimes North Frisian. All will know High German, often being the only language of young people and children. Members of the Danish minority are taught Standard Danish as well in schools, but often choose to communicate in German in everyday life.

Language, especially spoken language, is not necessarily linked with national identification. Family ties and informal local contact across the border used to be very common, with South Jutlandic being the first language of both Danish-minded and German-minded people. Sometimes, the purest South Jutlandic may be found among older people who identify as German. Since they have not attended Danish schools, their speech is not influenced by Standard Danish. With urbanisation in the recent decades, the crisscross of dialects and national sentiment has faded, with High German becoming the first choice everywhere, but some South Jutlandic words are often retained in the vocabulary.

== History ==
Historically, the Danish language had a much larger extension in South Slesvig than today. South Jutlandic was spoken down to the Danevirke wall south of Schleswig town, close to the Viking town of Hedeby, and to Eckernförde on the east coast. South of this was a sparsely inhabited area which after the Viking Age became populated with Saxon settlers whose language is now better known as Low German. The western islands and the west coast were settled by Frisians. A little further inland Frisians and Danes were mixed.

With the reformation in the 16th century the national language was installed in church instead of Latin. In Slesvig this meant not the language of the peasantry, but that of the dukes and gentry, being first Low German and later High German. German was the language of administration in all of Slesvig. In Northern Slesvig, however, priests were educated at the chapter of Haderslev and Danish was spoken in church. The church language border was very similar to the present-day Danish-German border which was created by plebiscite in 1920.

During the 17th and the 18th centuries, the population in the area south of the Schlei (Sli) inlet switched to Low German, few details being known about their former South Jutlandic dialect. The people of Angeln (Danish Angel), the countryside between Flensburg and the Schlei where the Angles who settled England also originally came from, kept to their South Jutlandic dialect for a longer time, but often had some knowledge of Low German as well.

The Angel dialect became extinct around 1900. A few records of it exist and show that it was similar to the South Jutlandic of the Sønderborg area in North Slesvig, across the Flensborg Fjord. The Low German dialect of Angel still has a great deal of Danish words and grammatical influence, which makes it difficult to understand for other Low German speakers.

During the 19th century the South Jutlandic dialect had a status inferior to Low German, and parents started to encourage their children to speak Low German, so they would be better prepared for school, where education was in High German. Some scholars assume that centuries with German spoken in church made people identify with the German nationality, even if they still spoke a Danish vernacular at home.

The Danish government, for political reasons, wished to halt this language shift from Danish to German. After the First War of Schleswig, in 1851, the government issued the Slesvig Language Rescripts, ordering the school language to be Danish in areas where the peasantry spoke Danish and even in an area stretching further south, into the Low German speaking area. Church language would alternate between Danish and German. Standard Danish had never been widely used in South Slesvig even where the populace spoke a Danish dialect. The dominant official language was German, and the measures of the government had quite the adverse effect, reinforcing anti-Danish sentiment. A pattern emerged, with the poorest in rural areas sticking to South Jutlandic, the wealthier peasants speaking Low German as the lingua franca and the educated townsmen speaking High German.

A variety of South Jutlandic was spoken until the 1940s in an area west of the town of Schleswig, 40 km south of the present border. Called Fjoldedansk after the village Fjolde (German: Viöl) or sydslesvigsk (southern Schleswigian), the dialect had many archaic features otherwise lost in Danish, such as verbs fully inflected in person and number. The village was isolated between surrounding moorland, creating a language island, similar to the case of the Saterland Frisian language.

== Place names ==
Place names in South Slesvig are of almost exclusively Danish origin, except in North Frisia and the southernmost area. Typical Scandinavian endings include -by, -bøl, -trup, -lund, -ved, -toft (in German form: -by, -büll, -trup, -lund, -witt, -toft). In some cases the South Jutlandic form has been eradicated from the Standard Danish variety of the name, but is still visible in the Germanised version:

Standard Danish	South Jutlandic	German
Meden	Mejn	Meyn
Bilskov	Bilskau	Billschau
Agtrup	Achtrup	Achtrup
Jydbæk	Jybæk	Jübek
Sønderup	Synnerup	Sünderup

In many other cases the Germanised versions are out of etymological context. Examples include the Danish ending -næs (peninsula) being replaced by -nitz, an unrelated Slavic ending which is common in eastern Germany. Such arbitrary translations were often made by the central Prussian government after the whole of Slesvig was ceded to Prussia after the war of 1864.

The South Jutlandic name of the town of Schleswig (Slesvig), from which the region derives its name, was Sljasvig with the stress on the second syllable.
