= Angel Danish =

Variant of South Jutlandic / Danish

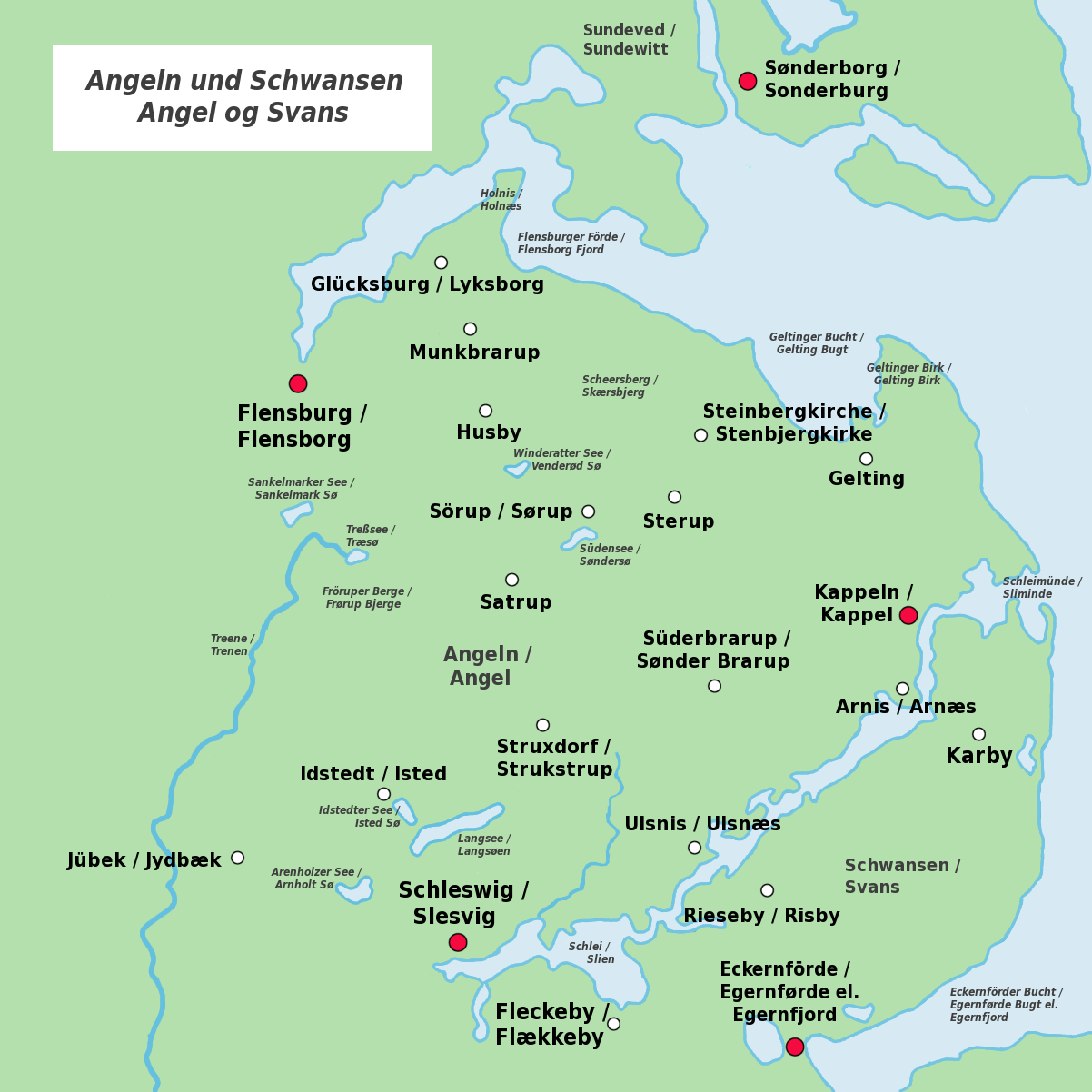
Angeln/Angel and Schwansen/Svansø in Southeastern Schleswig

Angel Danish (German: Angeldänisch, Danish: angeldansk or angelbomål) was a variant of South Jutlandic spoken in the regions of Angeln and Schwansen in Southern Schleswig partly until the 20th century. Both landscapes belonged to the Danish Duchy of Schleswig until 1864, since then to Germany.

Characteristic of Angel Danish was, among other things, the tonal pitch accent (like in the Danish dialects of Als and Langeland as well as in Swedish and Norwegian) and the fricative for the hard G (like today in the Angel Low German). There were also elevations from /o/ to /u/ (instead of Danish honning it was hunne in Angel Danish, cf. Icelandic hunang). There were also older Nordic forms such as hvénner (German wenn, Danish hvornår, Old Norse hvenær), mjølk (German Milch, Danish mælk, Old Norse mjólk) or gut (German Junge, Danish dreng, Norwegian gutt). However, there were also adoptions from German such as teller (Danish tallerken) or hunger (Danish sult).

The dialect has never been an official school or church language. In the 18th and 19th centuries, Angel Danish was increasingly replaced by Low and High German. The last record of the dialect was made in northern Angeln in the 1930s. A travelogue from 1813 documents the language change from Angel Danish to German in Swania in the first half of the 19th century.

== Bibliography ==
- Harald Wolbersen: Der Sprachwechsel in Angeln im 19. Jahrhundert – Eine kulturhistorische Untersuchung zum Verlust der dänischen Varietät „Sønderjysk“ im Transformationsprozess zur Moderne, Hamburg/Hamborg 2016, ISBN 978-3-8300-9212-4
- Harald Wolbersen: Die dänische Sprache in der Region Angeln, in: Nordeuropa-Forum, Berlin 2015
- Georg Saß: Angeldänische Sprachdokumente, in: Jahrbuch des Heimatvereins Angeln, Kappeln/Kappel 2005
- Bent Jul Nielsen und Magda Nyberg: Ordbog over den danske dialekt i Angel, Copenhagen/København 1995
- Johannes Kok: Det Danske Folkesprog i Sønderjylland, Copenhagen/København 1863–70 (1. Bd. 1863 (GB), 2. Bd. 1867 (GB))
- Eiler Henning Hagerup: Om det danske Sprog i Angel, Copenhagen/København 1854 (GB)
  - Om det danske Sprog i Angel. Af E. Hagerup. Anden forgøgede Udgave, efter Forfatterens Død besörget af K. J. Lyngby. Ordbog. Sproglære. Sprogprøver, Copenhagen/København 1867 (GB)
