= Jens Høysgaard =

Danish philologist (1698–1773)

Jens Pedersen Høysgaard (Danish: [ˈjens ˈhʌjˀsˌkɒˀ]; December 25, 1698 – April 21, 1773) was a Danish philologist, caretaker at the University of Copenhagen from 1737–1759, and bell-ringer at Trinitatis Church. In spite of never holding an academic post, he wrote several highly insightful treatises on Danish and Latin. Today, his work on Danish is considered the best of the early grammatical analyses of the Danish language. In 1743, he was the first to describe the stød, an important aspect of Danish phonology, in his Concordia res parvæ crescunt, eller Anden Prøve af Dansk Orthographie, in which he also introduced the letter Å å to the Danish alphabet.

== Bibliography ==
- (1743). Concordia res parvæ crescunt, eller Anden Prøve af Dansk Orthographie. [Reprinted in Bertelsen 1920 (vol. IV): 219-248.]
- (1747). Accentuered og Raisonnered Grammatica. [Reprinted in Bertelsen 1920 (vol. IV): 251-488.] (at Google Books)
- (1752). Methodisk Forsøg til en Fuldstændig Dansk Syntax. [Reprinted in Bertelsen 1923 (vol. V): 3-506.] (at Google Books)
- (1769). Første Anhang til den Accentuerede Grammatika. [Reprinted in Bertelsen 1923 (vol. V): 509-550]
