= Langdos =

Bronze Age burial mound in Jutland, Denmark

Langdos, Langdås (Langdysse)
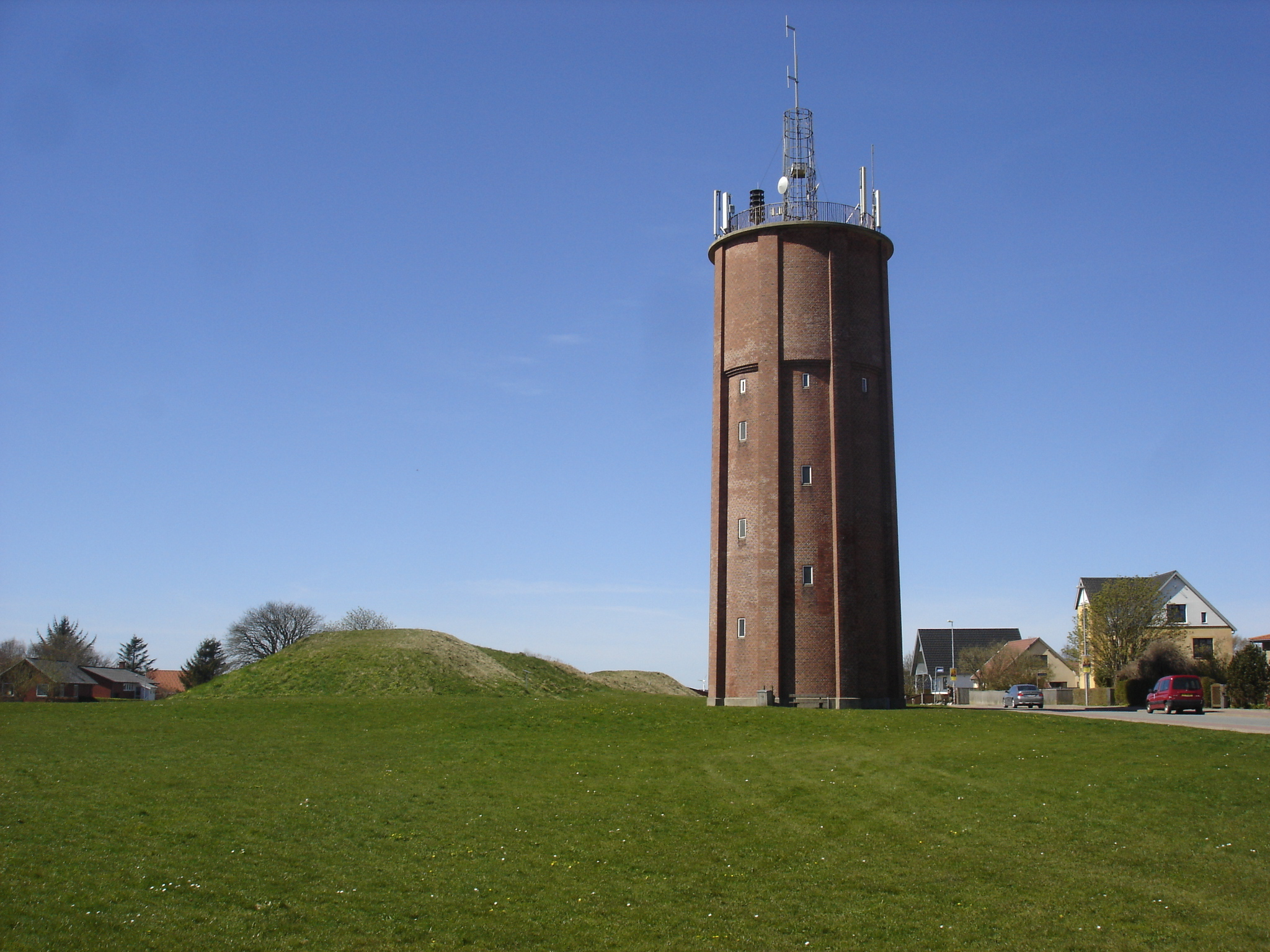
- The longbarrow and the watertower next to it

- Location within Denmark
- Location: Thisted
- Coordinates: 56°57′32″N 8°40′19″E

Langdos, formerly also Langdaas (in Jutish, or Langdysse in Standard Danish, meaning "long mound") is the largest Bronze Age burial mound in Denmark, located in Thisted, Jutland. The burial mound is 140 metres long (originally 175 m) and was built between 1800 and 1000 BC. However, according to the listing at the Danish ministry of culture, it is a Stone Age mound dating from 3950 to 2800 BC.

Part of the barrow has been damaged in the 1880s due to gravel extraction and slightly by the German Wehrmacht during the occupation of Denmark. The westernmost fifth of the barrow has since over 100 years been cut by a road and ploughed over, and in 1960 that part was excavated and sacrificed for a villa area.

The "Langdos man" (Jutish: æ Langdosmand) was once believed to be a giant living in the barrow. Another Danish word for burial mound is kæmpehøj, "giant's hill". Until c. 1900, around Easter, pins were placed into the mound by children who then played around it. During the 1960 excavation a burial chamber with bronze fibulas was found in the eastern intact end, allowing to date the mound to the older Bronze Age, but also medieval clay vessels hinting that sacrifice has taken place until rather recently.

== See also ==
- Draugr
