= T-word =

T-word may refer to:

- The T-Word (film), a 2014 MTV documentary by Laverne Cox
- In Danish grammar, a linguistic term meaning "of neuter grammatical gender"
- T-word, a euphemism for tranny, a pejorative term for transgender individuals
