= Nina Grønnum =

Danish retired phonetician (born 1945)

Nina Grønnum (Danish: [ˈninæ ˈkʁɶnɔm]; born 1 March 1945 in Copenhagen) is a Danish retired phonetician and associate professor emeritus from the University of Copenhagen. She is best known for her work on the pronunciation of Danish and especially her many studies on Danish intonation and prosody. She went by her married name Nina Thorsen or Nina Grønnum Thorsen until the 1980s.

She is included in Krak's Blue Book and the Royal Danish Academy of Sciences and Letters since 2003, and has been a fellow of The Society of Sciences in Lund member of the Council of the International Phonetic Association and vice institute leader of Institute of Nordic Studies and Linguistics at the University of Copenhagen.

She has been on the editorial boards of Acta Linguistica Hafniensia, the Journal of the International Phonetic Association and Nordic Journal of Linguistics.

== Biography ==
In 1972, she majored in phonetics from the University of Copenhagen and was assistant professor there from 1972 to 1976 and then associate professor (from 1993 with special qualifications) until 2008 where she retired. She received the equivalent of a PhD in 1981, and the dr.phil degree in 1992 on the basis of her Groundworks of Danish intonation

== Selected publications ==
=== Books ===
- Grønnum, Nina (1992), The groundworks of Danish intonation, Copenhagen: Museum Tusculanum Press, ISBN 978-8772891699
- Grønnum, Nina; Rischel, Jørgen, eds. (2001), To Honour Eli Fischer-Jørgensen: festschrift on the occasion of her 90th birthday, February 11th, 2001, Travaux du Cercle Linguistique de Copenhague, Copenhagen: C. A. Reitzel, ISBN 8778762138
- Grønnum, Nina (2005), Fonetik og fonologi, Almen og Dansk (in Danish) (3rd ed.), Copenhagen: Akademisk Forlag, ISBN 87-500-3865-6
- Grønnum, Nina (2007), Rødgrød med fløde – En lille bog om dansk fonetik (in Danish), Copenhagen: Akademisk Forlag, ISBN 978-87-500-3918-1
- Rischel, Jørgen (2008), Grønnum, Nina; Gregersen, Frans; Basbøll, Hans (eds.), Sound Structure in Language, Oxford University Press, ISBN 9780199544349

=== Papers ===
- Grønnum, Nina (1998a), "Illustrations of the IPA: Danish", Journal of the International Phonetic Association, 28 (1 & 2): 99–105, doi:10.1017/s0025100300006290, S2CID 249412109
- Grønnum, Nina (1998b), "Intonation in Danish", in Hirst, Daniel; Cristo, Albert Di (eds.), Intonation Systems, Cambridge: Cambridge University Press, pp. 131–151, ISBN 9780521395137
