= Hans Basbøll =

Danish linguist

Hans Basbøll (Danish: [ˈhænˀs ˈpæsˌpølˀ]; born 12 July 1943) is a Danish linguist and professor of Nordic languages at the University of Southern Denmark since 1975, member of Det Kongelige Danske Videnskabernes Selskab since 1991 and member of Dansk Sprognævn, the official regulatory body of Danish, in 1991–97. Basbøll has written much on various aspects of Danish, which includes The Phonology of Danish (2005), one of the most complete and authoritative sources on modern Danish phonology, and is currently working at the Center for Child Language (Center for Børnesprog) at the University of Southern Denmark in Odense. A Festschrift honouring Basbøll was published in 2003.
