= Jutlandic =

Group of dialects of Danish

- jysk
- Native to: Denmark
- Region: Jutland (Denmark) and in the northern parts of Southern Schleswig (Germany).
- Language family: Indo-European: Germanic; North Germanic; East Scandinavian; Danish; Jutlandic
- Dialects: South Jutlandic

Language codes
- ISO 639-3: jut
- Glottolog: juti1236

Jutlandic, or Jutish (Danish: jysk; pronounced [ˈjysk]), is the western variety of Danish, spoken on the peninsula of Jutland in Denmark.

Generally, Jutlandic can be divided into two different dialects: general or Northern Jutlandic (nørrejysk; further divided into western and eastern) and Southern Jutlandic (sønderjysk). However, the linguistic variation is considerably more complicated and well over 20 separate isoglosses exist throughout Jutland. There are major phonological differences between the dialects, but also very noteworthy morphological, syntactic, and semantic variations.

== Subdialects ==
The different subdialects of Jutlandic differ somewhat from each other, and are generally grouped in three main dialects, where two of them are sometimes considered together.

=== Sønderjysk ===
Sønderjysk (South Jutlandic) is often seen as very difficult for other speakers of Danish, even other Jutlandic dialects to understand. Instead of the normal Danish stød, it has tonal accents like Swedish. Many of the phonemes are also different, including velar fricatives much like in German. It also has the definite article before the noun, as opposed to the standard Danish postclitic article.

=== Østjysk ===
Østjysk (East Jutlandic) is the closest to the standard of the three Jutlandic dialects, but still differs widely in the pronunciation of vowels and the voiced stops word initially or intervocalically. Some dialects of East Jutlandic also still have three genders, like the majority of Norwegian dialects.

=== Vestjysk ===
Vestjysk (West Jutlandic) is also well known for an enclitic article as well as a complete lack of gender distinction. Phonetically, it is known for having [w] for the phoneme /v~ʋ/ in all positions, as opposed to only post-vocalically in standard Danish. It also can exhibit stød in slightly different environments from the standard.

== Phonology ==
=== Consonants ===
Standard Danish phonology contains nasal, aspirated voiceless and devoiced plosives (labial, alveolar, and velar). Four voiceless fricatives ([f, s, ɕ, h]) are present, as well as four approximants: [ʊ̯, ð̞, ɪ̯, ɐ̯]. There are also four approximants, including three regular and one lateral: [ʋ, l, j, ʁ]. Below is a table depicting the phonemic inventory of Danish and Jutlandic consonants, with phonemes only seen in the dialects of Jutland (jysk) in bold.

Danish/Jutlandic consonants
	Bilabial	Labiodental	Alveolar	Alveopalatal	Palatal	Velar	Uvular	Glottal
Nasal	m		n		**ɲ**	ŋ		
Plosive	pʰ, b̥		tˢ, d̥			kʰ, ɡ̊		
Fricative	**β**	f, **v**	s	ɕ		**x**, **ɣ**		h
Approximant		ʋ (ʊ̯)	ð̞		**ç**, j (ɪ̯)		ʁ (ɐ̯)	
Lateral			l		**ʎ**			
Velar coarticulation	**ʍ**, **w**		**ɫ**					

The most prevalent phonological process in Jutlandic consonants is lenition, which is the weakening of originally voiceless consonants in either the coda of a syllable or word as well as intervocalically. This process causes voicing as well as the reduction from a stop to a fricative and finally to a sonorant. The final step of lenition is then complete apocope.

This phenomenon can be seen in all its stages in the Jutlandic dialects, although it shows considerably more variability in the alveolars. The bilabials still have the approximant in one dialect, but no null phoneme and the velars have no sonorants, only a voiceless stop and fricative.

The stages of the lenition as well as which dialects they occur in can be seen in the table below. Multiple possibilities for the same stage are shown separated by a semicolon. In Maps 4.0 and 4.2 the spread of the pronunciation of [d] and [ɡ] are shown. The ⟨÷⟩ represents the null or zero morpheme in the maps, the ⟨-j⟩ and ⟨-r⟩ are [ɪ̯] and [ɐ̯] respectively and ⟨q⟩ is the devoiced velar stop [ɡ̊] while ⟨ch⟩ stands for the fricative [χ]. Vends and Læsø are regions usually belonging to the Northern Jutlandic dialectal region whereas Fjolds is the border region between Germany and Denmark, normally considered part of South Jutlandic (Sønderjysk).

Standard lenition	-v Stop [t]	+v Stop [d]	+ or – v fricative [s, z, ð, θ]	Flapping [ɾ]	Approximant [ð̞, j, r]	∅
Standard lenition	Old Danish	Standard Danish	North Western Jutlandic, Northern Jutlandic, Southern Jutlandic		Mid-Eastern Jutlandic; Mid-Western Jutlandic, South Jutlandic1	Vends, East South Jutlandic
Jutlandic alveolars	⟨t⟩, [t]	⟨d⟩, [d̥]	[ð̞]	N/A	[ɪ̯, ɐ̯]	∅
Jutlandic alveolars	Old Danish	Standard Danish, Mid-Eastern Jutlandic, Fjolde	Northern Jutlandic, Mid-Eastern Jutlandic; Middle and Southern Jutlandic, North South Jutlandic; South Jutlandic	N/A	Læsø	
Jutlandic bilabials	⟨p⟩, [p]	⟨b⟩, [b̥]	[β, v, f]	N/A	[w]	N/A
Jutlandic bilabials	Old Danish	Standard Danish, Northern Jutlandic, North South Jutlandic	South Jutlandic	N/A		N/A
Jutlandic velars	⟨k⟩, [k]	⟨g⟩, [ɡ̊]	[x]	N/A	N/A	N/A

e.g. In Southern Jutlandic, Scandinavian post-vocalic p, k become [f, x] word-finally, whereas Standard Danish has b, g, e.g. søge 'to seek' [ˈsøːx] = Standard Danish [ˈsøːɪ], tabe 'lose' [ˈtʰɑːf] = Standard Danish [ˈtˢæːbə, ˈtˢæːʊ]. In the northern part of Southern Jutland, these sounds are voiced fricatives between vowels, i.e. [v, ɣ]: e.g. søger 'seeks' [ˈsøːɣə] = Standard Danish [ˈsøːɐ], taber 'loses' [ˈtʰɑːvə] = Standard Danish [ˈtˢæːˀbɐ, ˈtˢæʊ̯ˀɐ].

=== Vowels ===
Standard Danish has a large vowel inventory and contrasts length on many vowels. Vowels can also be glottalized where the so-called stød is present and many change their quality depending on whether or not they are preceded or followed by an /r/ (phonetically [ʁ]).

Danish vowels
	Front				Central		Back	
	unrounded		rounded		Central		Back	
	short	long	short	long	short	long	short	long
Close	i, ɪ	iː	y	yː	ʊ		u	uː
Close-mid	e	eː	ø	øː	ə		o	oː
Open-mid	ɛ	ɛː	œ	œː	ɐ, ʌ		ɔ	ɔː
Open	æ, a	æː	ɶ	ɶː	ɑ	ɑː	ɒ	ɒː

Jutlandic exhibits many diphthongs not present in standard Danish. The long stressed mid vowels /eː, øː, oː/ are diphthongised as /iə, yə, uə/ respectively in central Jutland and the South Schleswig dialect, e.g. ben [ˈbiˀən] = Standard Danish [ˈbeːˀn] 'leg', bonde 'farmer' [ˈbuəɲ] = Standard Danish [ˈbɔnə] (< bōndi).

South Jutlandic has the same vowel quality for these vowels, but exhibits a tonal distinction, which is present in place of the Danish stød. Northern Jutlandic raises them without diphthongising them to /iː, yː, uː/ respectively. In Hards, a small area of Mid Western Jutland, the vowels become diphthongised with a glide much like in English, and are pronounced as /ej, øj, ow/.

In Northern Jutland, /iː, yː, uː/ are also diphthongised in two syllable words with a glide. Northern Jutlandic always has the glide present (/ij, yj, uw/) and North Western Jutlandic tends towards the glide, but it is not present for all speakers. Long ⟨a⟩ and ⟨å⟩ have been raised to [ɔː] and [oː] respectively in northern Jutlandic, e.g. sagde 'said' [ˈsɔː] = Standard Danish [ˈsæː(ə)], gå 'go, walk' [ˈɡoːˀ] = Standard Danish [ˈɡ̊ɔːˀ].

Map 2.2 shows the different possible pronunciations for the standard Danish mid, stressed vowels which is further explained in the following table:

Standard Danish	Northern Jutlandic	North Western Jutlandic	Mid-Western Jutlandic	Mid-Eastern Jutlandic	Southern Jutlandic	South Jutlandic	South Schleswig dialect
/iː/ (Note: In disyllabic words.)	[ij]	[i(j)]	[iː]	[iː]	[iː]	[iː]	[iː]
/yː/	[yj]	[y(j)]	[yː]	[yː]	[yː]	[yː]	[yː]
/uː/	[uw]	[u(w)]	[uː]	[uː]	[uː]	[uː]	[uː]
/eː/	[iː]	[iə]	[ej]	[iə]	[iə]	[eː]	[iə]
/øː/	[yː]	[yə]	[øj]	[yə]	[yə]	[øː]	[yə]
/oː/	[uː]	[uə]	[ow]	[uə]	[uə]	[oː]	[uə]
/æː/	[eː]	[œː]	[œː]	[œː]	[œː]	[œː]	[eœ]
/ɔː/	[oː]	[oː]	[oː]	[oː]	[oː]	[ɔː]	[oɒ]
/ɑː/	[oː]	[ɔː]	[ɔː]	[ɔː]	[ɔː]	[ɒː]	[ɒː]

Outside of these diphthongs arising from changes in pronunciation from standard Danish long vowels, there are also the following diphthongs: [ow], [ɔw], [ej], [æj] [ɒw] [iw]/[yw], [ew]/[øw] and [æw]/[œw]. [ow] and [ɔw] are both present in Vends, North Western Jutlandic and Mid-Western Jutlandic but only one occurs in Østjysk, South Jutlandic and Southern Jutlandic. There is a tendency towards [ɔw], but in Mid-Eastern Jutlandic [ow] can be found instead. The same sort of alternation is also seen with [ej] and [æj]. In Mid-Western Jutlandic, Northern Jutlandic and North Western Jutlandic both diphthongs exist. In Mid-Eastern Jutlandic there is an alternation between the two, but each speaker only has one. In Southern Jutlandic and South Jutlandic, only [æj] is found. [ɒw] is present as a diphthong in all of Jutland with the exception of the island of Fanø (off of South western Jutland), but has different pronunciations depending on length of the segments. The remaining diphthongs show a distribution based on rounding. In the majority of Jutland the unrounded diphthong is rounded. In South Eastern Jutland the rounded one is unrounded and only in certain parts of Sønderjylland are both diphthongs preserved. Map 2.7 shows the rounding alternation for the front, close diphthong [iw]/[yw].

An interesting phenomenon in western South Jutlandic and Mid-Western Jutlandic, North Western Jutlandic as well as Northern Jutlandic is the so-called klusilspring. The klusilspring can be seen as a modified stød that only occurs on high vowels (/iː, yː, uː/). These long vowels are shortened and then followed by a klusil, or plosive, or in some cases a spirant. (See Map 2.1) In Vends (Northern Jutlandic) and western South Jutlandic the three pronunciations become: [itj], [ytj], and [uk] and they have the same pronunciation but followed by a schwa if not in the coda. An area in North Western Jutlandic designated on the map as Him-V has instead [ikj], [ykj] and [uk] and in Mid-Western Jutlandic it is similar with the /uː/ also containing a glide [ukw] and in all three cases a schwa is inserted if it is not in the coda of the syllable. The rest of North Western Jutlandic along the coast has the schwa as well but a fricative instead of a stop, so the sounds are [iɕ], [yɕ], and [uɕ]. In the rest of the Jutlandic dialects the vowel quality is overall the same, with gliding in North Western Jutlandic (Han-V and Han-Ø) on the map and only unrounded front vowels in Djurs dialect.

=== Stød ===
As mentioned earlier, the klusilspring is an alternative of the stød that occurs only with high vowels. In the other mainland Scandinavian languages as well as South Jutlandic, there are two different tonemes which distinguish between words that were originally one or two syllables. Tone 1 is a simple rising then falling tone in most dialects and tone 2 is more complex, e.g. hus 'house' [ˈhúːs] = Standard Danish [ˈhuːˀs] ~ huse 'houses' [ˈhùːs] = Standard Danish [ˈhuːsə]. In standard Danish as well as Jutlandic, tone 1 is replaced with a nonsegmental glottalization and tone 2 disappears entirely. Glottalization can only occur on vowels or sonorants and only in one or two-syllable words and is realized in transcription as ['].

However, in two-syllable words the second syllable must be a derivational morpheme as the historical environment of tone 1 was one-syllable words and tone 2 only occurred on two-syllable words. Due to apocope and the morphology, both tones and the stød can now be found on one- and two-syllable words. There can be multiple stød segments per word, if the word is a compound, which separates its phonetically from the tonemes of Swedish, Norwegian and South Jutlandic, which can only occur once over the whole word. However, in contrast to the standard Danish stød, the Jutlandic stød does not usually occur in monosyllabic words with a sonorant + voiceless consonant. Only Djurs dialect and the city dialect of Aarhus have the stød in this environment.

As mentioned before, most of north west Jutland does not have a stød after short high vowels, and instead has the klusilspring. The stød is still present on sonorants and mid and low vowels in the proper environment. Western Jutlandic also has a stød on the vowel in originally two-syllable words with a geminate voiceless consonant such as ⟨tt⟩, ⟨kk⟩, or ⟨pp⟩ e.g. katte 'cats' [ˈkʰaˀt] = Standard Danish [ˈkʰæd̥ə]; itte 'not' [ˈeˀ(t)] = Standard Danish ikke [ˈeɡ̊ə].

=== Other phonological characteristics ===
- Jutlandic also exhibits a strong tendency towards apocope, i.e. skipping the e [ə] often found in unstressed syllables, which is itself a weakening of an original North Germanic -i, -a or -u, which causes many words to be distinguished based purely on vowel length or the presence of the stød. Most unstressed syllables are dropped and in some cases final segments, often {r} e.g. kaste 'throw' [ˈkʰasd̥] = Standard Danish [ˈkʰæsd̥ə] (Swedish [ˈkʰasta]).
- Jutlandic is further known for lacking the diphthong in the first person nominative pronoun jeg. It is pronounced in the majority of Jutland as [ɑ] but in South Jutlandic and North Western Jutlandic as [æ]. The difference goes back to different forms in Proto-Norse, namely ek and eka, both found in early Runic inscriptions. The latter form has a regular breaking of e to ja before an a in the following syllable. The short form, without breaking, is also found in Norwegian, Faroese and Icelandic.
- In Northern Jutlandic v is a labiovelar approximant before back vowels (in the northernmost dialects also before front vowels), whereas it is a Labiodental approximant in Standard Danish, e.g. vaske 'wash' [ˈwasɡ] = Standard Danish [ˈʋæsɡ̊ə]. The same dialects have voiceless variants of v and j in the initial combinations hj and hv, e.g. hvem 'who' [ˈʍɛmˀ] = Standard Danish [ˈʋɛmˀ], hjerte 'heart' [ˈçaɐ̯d̥, ˈçɑːd̥] = Standard Danish [ˈjaɐ̯d̥ə].
- In most parts of Jutland, nd becomes [ɲ], e.g. finde 'find' [ˈfeɲ] = Standard Danish [ˈfenə].

== Grammar ==
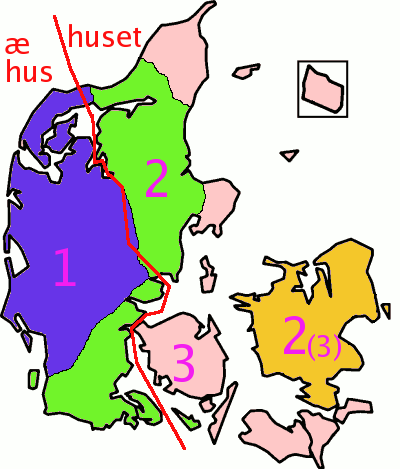
The distribution of one, two, and three grammatical genders in Danish dialects. In Zealand the transition from three to two genders has happened fairly recently. West of the red line the definite article goes before the word as in English or German; east of the line it takes the form of a suffix.

One of the hallmarks of the Scandinavian languages is the postclitic definite marker. For example: en mand 'a man', mand-en 'the man'. In standard Danish this postclitic marker is only used when there is no adjective present, but if there is an adjective, a definite article is used instead: den store mand 'the big man'. Further, standard Danish has a two gender system, distinguishing between the neuter (intetkøn, -et) and "other" (fælleskøn, -en) genders. In Jutland, however, very few dialects match the standard in these two aspects. There are dialects with one, two and three genders, as well as dialects lacking the postclitic definite marker entirely.

=== Gender ===
Originally the Scandinavian languages, like modern German as well as Icelandic, had three genders. These three genders, masculine, feminine, and neuter are still present in many dialects, notably most dialects of Norwegian. However, in all standard versions of the mainland Scandinavian languages, there are only two genders (Norwegian has three genders, but in Bokmål – one of two written standards – feminine nouns may be inflected like the masculine nouns, making it possible to use only two genders). The masculine and feminine fell together, taking the masculine article (or the feminine in Insular Danish), and the neuter stayed separate. Three genders remain in northern Jutland and far in the east, which could potentially be explained through dialect contact with both Norwegian and Swedish dialects which preserve all three genders. The loss of all gender distinction in the west, though, is unique to Jutlandic. Note though that West Jutlandic still has two noun classes, n- and t-words like standard Danish, they are just not genders. t-words in West Jutlandic are limited to mass nouns.

Region	Vends, Djurs dialect	East Jutland, South Jutlandic	West Jutland
Genders	3	2	1
masculine 'a man'	i(n) mand		
feminine 'a woman'	æn kone		
common gender		æn kone, æn mand	æn kone, æn mand, æn hus
neuter 'a house'	æt hus	æt hus	

=== Article ===
The definite marker is also not consistent in the Jutlandic dialects. In the west, where only one gender is present, as well as in all of Southern Jutlandic and South Jutlandic, the definite marker is a free morpheme that comes before the noun. It is not, however, the same as the free morpheme found in standard Danish when an adjective precedes a noun. It is phonetically realised as [æ].

Region	West and South Jutland	East and North Jutland, Standard
masculine 'the man'	æ mand	manden
neuter 'the house'	æ hus	huset
feminine 'the woman'	æ kone	konen
plural 'the men'	æ mænd	mændene

There are also small areas in Jutland where predicate adjectives, as well as adjectives in indefinite noun phrases, have gender congruence in the neuter form. In the dialects of South Schleswig, easternmost Djurs and the island of Samsø, adjectives take a -t ending which patterns with standard Danish: for example, et grønt glas [æt ɡʁœːnt ɡlas] 'a green glass' and glasset er grønt [ɡlas.ət æ ɡʁœːnt] 'the glass is green'. In Vends (Northern Jutlandic) there is no congruence on adjectives in indefinite noun phrases, but the -t is still present in predicate adjectives. The variability in the examples also reflects differences between number of genders, postclitic versus enclitic article and apocope: [æ ɡʁœn' ɡlas]; [ɡlast æ ɡʁœnt]. In the rest of Jutland, as a result of apocope, the -t disappears completely: [æt (æn) ɡʁœn' ɡlas]; [ɡlas.ə(t) (æ ɡlas) æ ɡʁœn'].

=== Semantics ===
The presence of a separate free morpheme definite marker in the western Jutlandic dialects [æ] has come to cause a contrastive semantic meaning difference with the standard Danish dem. Nouns that can be analyzed as mass nouns, as opposed to count nouns can take the [æ] article before an adjective. If the noun is, however, meant to be a count noun it uses the standard Danish plural article dem. An example of this would be dem små kartofler versus æ små kartofler 'the small potatoes'. Dem små kartofler refers to the small potatoes in a set, i.e. those 5 small potatoes on the table. Æ små kartofler refers instead to a mass noun, meaning potatoes that are generally small. It is like saying "the yellow potatoes" in English. It can either mean yellow potatoes as a whole, a mass noun or the yellow potatoes sitting on the table, as opposed to the red ones.

There is also a tendency to use hans or hendes instead of the Standard Danish sin when referring to the subject of the sentence. This means there is no longer a distinction between whether the possessive pronoun refers to the subject of the sentence or a third person, however, use of a word like egen/t 'own' can paraphrastically accomplish the same thing.

Standard Danish	Han ser sin hund 'He sees his (own) dog'	Han ser hans hund 'He sees his (another person's) dog'	Hans hund ser ham 'His dog sees him' (ambiguous)
Jutlandic	Han ser hans hund 'He sees his dog' (ambiguous)	Han ser hans hund 'He sees his dog' (ambiguous)	Hans hund ser ham 'His dog sees him' (ambiguous)

== Sociolinguistics ==
Today the old dialects, tied as they were to the rural districts, are yielding to new regional standards based on Standard Danish. Several factors have contributed to this process. The dialects, especially in the northernmost, western and southern regions, are often hard to understand for people originating outside Jutland.

The dialects also enjoy little prestige both nationally (the population of Zealand like to believe that the Jutlanders are slower not only in speech but also in thought) and regionally (the dialect is associated with rural life).

The Danish cultural, media and business life revolves around Copenhagen, and Jutland has only in recent decades seen substantial economic growth. In the 20th century dialects were usually suppressed by media, state institutions, and schools. In recent decades, a more liberal attitude towards dialects has emerged, but since the number of speakers has decreased, and almost all of the remaining dialect speakers master a regional form of Standard Danish as well, dialects are still being ignored.

== Characteristics ==
The new Jutlandic "regiolects" differ from the Copenhagen variety primarily by a distinct accent:

1. a higher tendency of apocope of unstressed [ə] (cf. above).
2. a higher pitch towards the end of a stressed syllable.
3. a slightly different distribution of stød: vej 'way' [ˈʋaɪ̯] = Standard Danish [ˈʋaɪ̯ˀ]; hammer 'hammer' [ˈhɑmˀɐ] = Standard Danish [ˈhɑmɐ].
4. the ending -et (definite article or passive participle) is pronounced [-(ə)d̥] instead of [-ð̩], e.g. hentet 'fetched' [ˈhɛnd̥əd̥] = Standard Danish [ˈhɛnd̥ð̩]; meget 'very, much' [ˈmaːɪ̯d̥] = Standard Danish [ˈmaːð̩, ˈmɑːð̩]
5. postvocalic d is pronounced [ɪ̯] or, before i, [d̥] in certain varieties of the regiolect: bade 'bath' [ˈb̥æːɪ̯] = Standard Danish ˈb̥æːð̩], stadig 'still' [ˈsd̥æːd̥i] = Standard Danish [ˈsd̥æːði]. These pronunciations are not favored by younger speakers.
6. or is pronounced [ɒː] in words where Standard Danish has [oɐ̯] (in closed syllables): torn 'thorn' [ˈtˢɒːˀn] = Standard Danish [ˈtˢoɐ̯ˀn]. On the other hand, one also hears hypercorrect pronunciations like tårn 'tower' [ˈtˢoɐ̯ˀn] = Standard Danish [ˈtˢɒːˀn].
7. the strong verbs have -en in the past participle not only in adjectival use, as in Standard Danish, but also in the compound perfect: han har funden for Standard Danish han har fundet den. Such forms belong to the low register of the Jutlandic regiolects.
8. a frequent use of hans, hendes 'his, her' instead of the reflexive pronoun sin to refer to the subject of the sentence: han kyssede hans kone 'he kissed his wife' for Standard Danish han kyssede sin kone (the other sentence would mean that he kissed somebody else's wife).
9. a lack of distinction between transitive and intransitive forms of certain related verbs like ligge ~ lægge 'lie, lay': han lagde i sengen 'he lay in the bed' for Standard Danish han lå i sengen (eastern speakers distinguish neither the present nor the infinitive of the verbs).
10. remnants of a regional vocabulary such as træls [ˈtˢʁɑls] 'annoying' (for Standard Danish irriterende [i(ɐ̯)ˈtˢeɐ̯ˀnə]), og [ˈʌ] 'too' (for Standard Danish også [ˈʌsə]), ikke og [eˈɡ̊ʌ] or, in higher style, ikke også [eˈɡ̊ʌsə] 'isn't it' (for Standard Danish ikke, ikke sandt [ˈeɡ̊(ə), eɡ̊ˈsænˀd̥]).

== Peter Skautrup Centre ==
The Peter Skautrup Centre for Jutlandic Research is a research centre at Aarhus University and the main centre for Jutlandic dialectology in Denmark. It was established in 1932 (under the name Institut for Jysk Sprog- og Kulturforskning), originally privately funded by grants, and headed by professor Peter Skautrup. In 1973 it became part of Aarhus University, and currently it forms part of the Department of Scandinavian Studies and Experience Economy within the School of Communication and Culture.

From 1932 to 1978, the center published the journal Sprog og Kultur ("Language and culture"), and from 1982 onwards Ord & Sag ("Word and cause").

The primary work of the center is focused on building the Jysk Ordbog ("Jutlandic Dictionary"), based on 3 million index cards collected since the 1930s and approximately 1050 hours of audio recordings of dialects from all parts of Jutland. Since 2000, it has been published online, but is still not completely finished. The center estimates (in 2018) that there is 30 years of work left.

== See also ==
- Danish dialects
- South Jutlandic
- Steen Steensen Blicher (wrote in Jutlandic)
